= CMA CGM Zheng He =

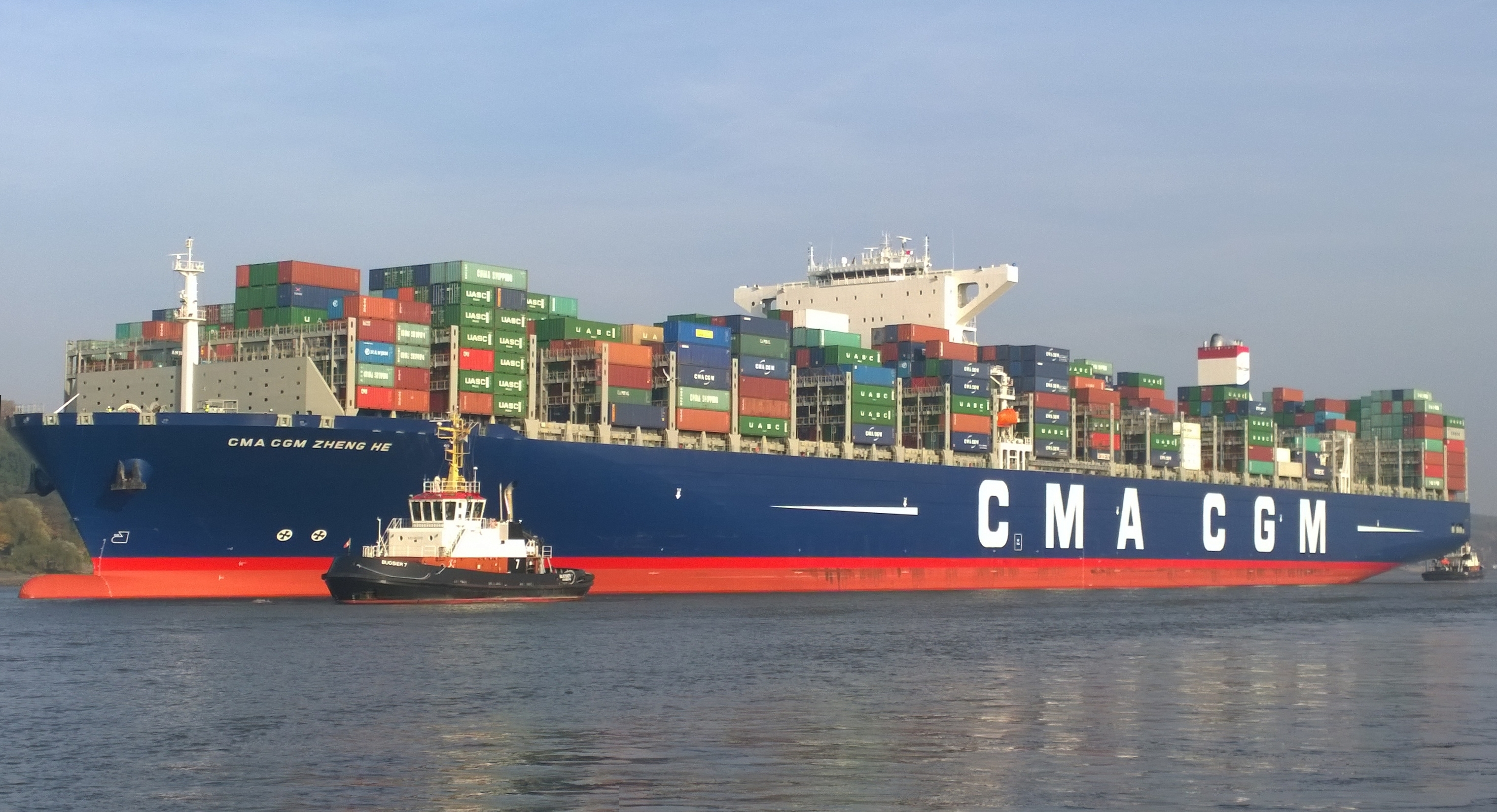
- The CMA CGM Zheng He on the Elbe

History
- Name: CMG CGM Zheng He
- Namesake: Zheng He
- Owner: CHC Second Shipping SA
- Operator: CMA CGM
- Port of registry: London, United Kingdom
- Builder: Shanghai Jiangnan Changxing Heavy Industry, China
- Completed: 2015
- In service: 2015
- Identification: Call sign: 2IQU8; IMO number: 9706906
- Status: In service

General characteristics
- Type: Container ship
- Tonnage: 178,228 GT; 116,356 NT; 185,000 DWT
- Length: 399.9 m (1,312 ft)
- Beam: 51 m (167 ft)
- Draft: 16.5 metres (54 ft)
- Installed power: Wärtsilä-Sulzer RTA96-C diesel engine, (34,320–80,080 kW)
- Propulsion: Single shaft; screw propeller Solid
- Speed: 14.7 kn to 22.3 kn
- Capacity: 17859 TEU
- Crew: 27

CMA CGM Zheng He is an Explorer class containership built for CMA CGM. It is among the world's largest containerships, at 17859 TEU.

The ship was built by Shanghai Jiangnan Changxing Heavy Industry, the same shipyard that built sister ship CMA CGM Benjamin Franklin. At the time of its launch it was the longest ship built on hull in China.

It is the second CMA CGM ship to be named for Zheng He as CMA CGM Marco Polo was originally named for the Chinese explorer.
