= CMA CGM Magellan =

Container ship built in 2010

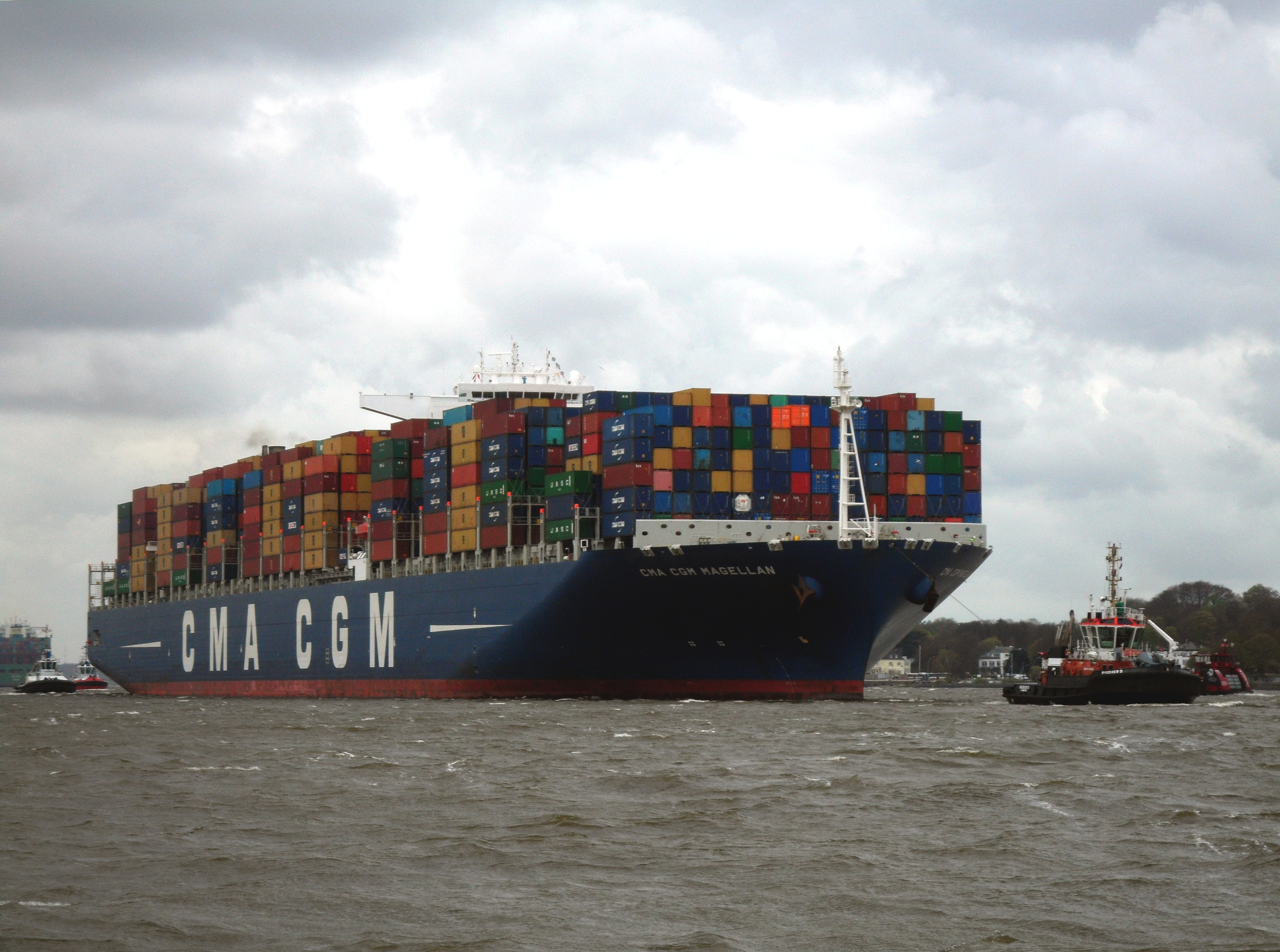
- CMA CGM Magellan with destination Port of Hamburg

History
- Name: CMA CGM Magellan
- Namesake: Ferdinand Magellan
- Operator: CMA CGM
- Port of registry: London, United Kingdom
- Builder: Daewoo Shipbuilding & Marine Engineering (DSME), South Korea
- Yard number: 4160
- Launched: 11 June 2010
- Completed: 28 September 2010
- In service: 2010
- Identification: IMO number: 9454424; Call sign: 2DTI4; MMSI number: 235081888
- Status: In service

General characteristics
- Class & type: Explorer-class container ship
- Tonnage: 150,269 GT; 80,802 NT; 157,254 DWT
- Length: 365.5 m (1,199 ft 2 in)
- Beam: 51.2 m (168 ft 0 in)
- Draft: 16 m (52 ft 6 in)
- Depth: 29.9 m (98 ft 1 in)
- Installed power: Wärtsilä-Hyundai 14RT-flex96C (80,080 kW, 107,390 hp)
- Propulsion: Single shaft; fixed-pitch propeller
- Speed: 24.1 knots (44.6 km/h; 27.7 mph)
- Capacity: 13,800 TEU

CMA CGM Magellan is an Explorer-class container ship built for CMA CGM. The ship is named after Portuguese explorer Ferdinand Magellan.
