= CMA CGM Christophe Colomb =

Container ship

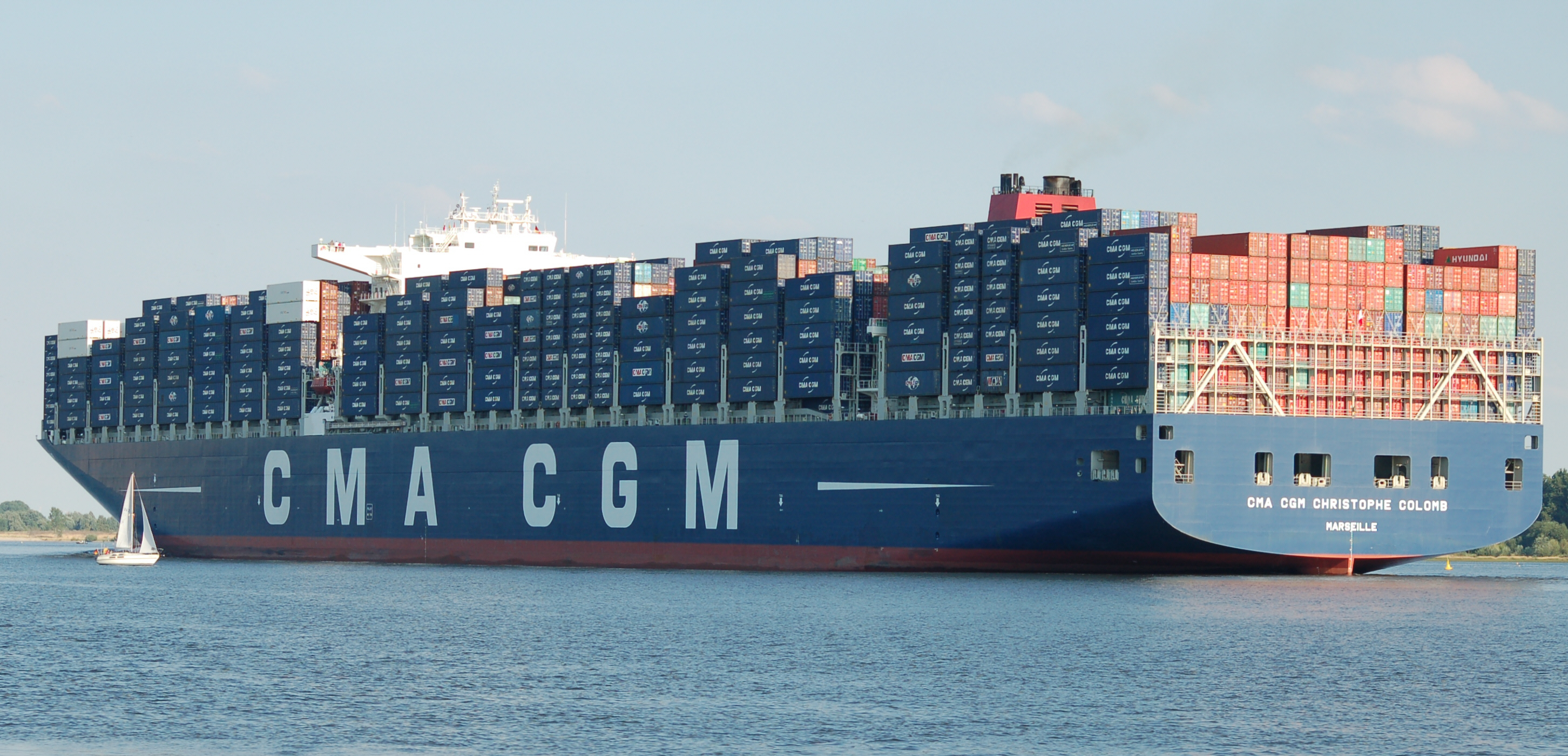
- CMA CGM Christophe Colomb, in the Elbe estuary

History
- Name: CMA CGM Christophe Colomb
- Namesake: Christopher Columbus
- Operator: CMA CGM
- Port of registry: Marseille, France
- Builder: Daewoo Shipbuilding & Marine Engineering (DSME), South Korea
- Yard number: 4156
- Completed: 10 November 2009
- In service: 2010
- Identification: IMO number: 9453559; Call sign: FNUY; MMSI number: 228315600
- Status: In service

General characteristics
- Class & type: Explorer-class container ship
- Tonnage: 153,022 GT; 81,900 NT; 165,375 DWT
- Length: 365.5 m (1,199 ft)
- Beam: 51.2 m (168 ft)
- Draft: 16 m (52 ft)
- Depth: 29.9 m (98 ft)
- Installed power: Wärtsilä-Hyundai 14RT-flex96C (80,080 kW (107,390 hp))
- Propulsion: Single shaft; fixed-pitch propeller
- Speed: 24.1 knots (44.6 km/h; 27.7 mph)
- Capacity: 13,344 TEU

CMA CGM Christophe Colomb is an Explorer-class container ship built for CMA CGM. It is named after Italian explorer Christopher Columbus. When delivered in November 2009, it was the largest container ship which carried passengers.
