= Jacques Saadé =

French-Lebanese businessman (1937–2018)

- جاك سعادة
- Born: 7 February 1937; Beirut, Lebanon
- Died: 24 June 2018 (aged 81)
- Education: London School of Economics
- Occupation: Businessman
- Known for: Founder, CMA CGM
- Notable work: Officer of the Legion of Honour
- Spouse: Naila Rapnouil Saadé
- Children: 3, including Rodolphe Saadé

Jacques Rodolphe Saadé (Arabic: جاك سعادة; 7 February 1937 – 24 June 2018) was a French-Lebanese-Syrian billionaire businessman. He was the founder and chairman of the CMA CGM, a French container transportation and shipping company, the fourth largest in the world as of June 2020.

== Biography ==
Jacques R. Saadé was born on 7 February 1937 in Beirut, Lebanon, and spent his childhood in Syria. His father, Rodolph, was a Syrian entrepreneur from Latakia, Syria, while his mother, Odette Nauphal, was Lebanese. He graduated from the London School of Economics in 1957 and took over the family business after the death of his father. His father had "established plants in Syria, we were producing tobacco, cottonseed, olive oil, ice, etc."

Based on his father's advice, Saadé did an internship in New York to learn about shipping after his graduation. This is where he discovered the container (capacity: one cubic metre) used by the American army during the Vietnam War. In a Les Echos article, Saadé said: "I thought the container was an excellent idea for transporting goods as it was closed, easy and quick."

The 1978 war in Lebanon prompted him to move to Marseille. This is where he set up Compagnie maritime d’affrètement (CMA) with his brother Johnny on September 13 of the same year. The company initially operated services between Marseille, Beirut and Syria. Saadé said: "I wanted the sea. Marseille is beautiful and the sea looks a little like that in Beirut."

In the beginning, there was family tension between Jacques Saadé and his brother Johnny. After difficult family disputes, Jacques took the helm alone.

In 1983, Saadé made the decision to cross the Suez Canal and extend the company lines to Mina-Qaboos in the Gulf of Oman. Jacques Saadé was trying to prepare the company for the "Far East" to win a competitive advantage over other carriers.

In 1986, after noticing that volumes from Asia were constantly on the rise, he decided to extend CMA's shipping lines to Asia (including Japan). He later traveled to China himself in 1992 to open the first regional office in Shanghai, entrusting the management of the company's development in Asia to John Wang, a professor at the Shanghai Maritime University.

In 1996 Saadé acquired CGM (Compagnie Générale Maritime) following privatization.

Two years later in 1998 came the acquisition by CMA of the National Australian Line ANL and in the following year 1999 merger of CMA and CGM and creation of the CMA CGM Group.

In 2006, Saadé concluded the acquisition of DELMAS and the CMA CGM Group became the third-largest shipping Group in the world. Three additional acquisitions were made in 2007: Chinese Company Cheng Lie Navigation Ltd, U.S. Lines, and COMANAV.

The shipping industry was affected by the 2008 financial crisis and the Great Recession. Jacques R. Saadé was opposed to breaking up the Group. Supported by his son Rodolphe Saadé, and daughter Tanya Saadé, he was convinced the container transport sector would bounce back. In 2010, CMA CGM signed an agreement with the family-run industrial Turkish group YILDIRIM. The agreement enabled the Group to strengthen its financial structure and secure finance for its investment plans. This also later led him to invest, notably in building the Group's first three 16,000 teu vessels: the CMA CGM Marco Polo, the CMA CGM Alexander Von Humboldt, and the CMA CGM Jules Verne.

In 2011, he built the Group's headquarters in Marseille: the CMA CGM Tower designed by Zaha Hadid, 147m in height with 33 floors. Today the CMA CGM Group is the city's biggest employer (2,400 staff).

In June 2013, and for the first time since 1962, it was the President of the French Republic, François Hollande, welcomed by Saadé, who inaugurated the CMA CGM Jules Verne, flagship of the CMA CGM fleet at the time. The French President met Jacques Saadé again in 2015 for the inauguration of the CMA CGM Bougainville in Port of Le Havre.

In 2017, Saadé appointed his son Rodolphe as CEO of CMA CGM. Later that year, Rodolphe Saadé became chairman too, with Saadé becoming founder chairman.

In 2018, Forbes Magazine listed Saade’s net worth at 7 billion Euros, making him the 228th richest man in the world at that time.

Saade died on 24 June 2018, at the age of 81.

== Notable achievements ==
- In 1986, he becomes president of the Franco-Lebanon Chamber of Commerce (later honorary president).
- Between 2006 and 2010, he was president of the France-Ukraine committee .
- In 2007, Saadé's career is singled out by the international magazine Seatrade, which votes him shipping's ‘Personality of the Year’. He is also awarded by the Naval Academy (Manley-Bendall prize) and the Arab Academy for Science, Technology and Maritime Transport in Alexandria (an Honorary Degree).
- In 2009, he was named an Officer of the French Legion of Honor.
- In 2010 he becomes President of the France-Jordan Council of Business Leaders,
- In 2012, he received the "Lifetime Achievement Award" from the magazine Containerization International (now owned by Lloyd's List)
- In 2013, Saadé was made an honorary citizen of the City of Marseille, joining directors of companies like Eurocopter, Onet, Orange and Pernod Ricard.
- In 2014, he received an honorary doctorate from the Lebanese American University (LAU). He also received the same year an award for encouraging the economic development of the Mediterranean Basin, as well as conveying a positive image of the area and promoting peace and tolerance worldwide, from the Association of the Mediterranean Chambers of Commerce and Industry (ASCAME).
- In 2015, he was named a Commander of the French Legion of Honor.

== Statements and actions regarding the environment ==
On the environment front, Saadé declared: "Our growth and a responsible attitude cannot be dissociated when facing the issues of our modern societies. CMA CGM must lead by example in terms of environmental protection, whether it be by acting against climate change or by preserving the maritime environment."

One of the reasons he was awarded the "Containerization International Lifetime Achievement Award" was for "being one of the first lines to use innovative technologies as a means of helping reduce emissions, thereby reducing his company's impact on the environment."

He chose to equip his fleet with new large capacity vessels fitted with the latest green technologies. These vessels, combined with various other actions, allowed the group to reduce by 50% its carbon emissions per shipped container per km on its owned fleet between 2007 and 2015, confirming an objective set in 2007.

On 1 June 2020 the master of a container ship APL England, Mohamad Zulkhaili Bin Alias, owned by CMA CGM & ANL (Singapore) lost about 50 containers overboard caused by poor cargo loading by the ships captain Mohamad Zulkhaili Bin Alias. The Australian Marine Safety Authority ordered $22 million from the ship's insurers under the Protection of the Seas Act, which must be paid before the ship will be released from detention at the Port of Brisbane. This money covers estimated clean-up and remediation costs.

== Family business model ==
When writing an article about family capitalism, Aymeric Dewimille wrote: "Loyally supported by his son Rodolphe, now Executive Officer in the Group, and his daughter Tanya, head of communications and on the Board of Directors, Jacques Saadé is totally committed to human values that traditionally underpin the governance of family-run companies... While the family-run company may not necessarily be called upon to save capitalism, one thing is proven, the family spirit can save companies."

The CMA CGM attitude has garnered the attention of the Anglo-Saxon analysts at Lloyd's List. In its 11 July 2011 edition, the British daily, a reference in the shipping industry, highlighted the fact that "with the support of a solid family network, Jacques R. Saadé fought tooth and nail during the crisis, keeping the creditors at bay, juggling the order books and deployment of his fleet, and having the courage to reject several potential investors waiting for a partner that does not interfere in the way he runs the company".

However, according to these British analysts, his tenacity paid off – the CMA CGM Group has since returned to profit. The daily French financial newspaper Les Echos said in 2011: "Many observers thought CMA CGM would not recover from the losses suffered two years ago, while Jacques R. Saadé said he always knew his company would survive."

Inclined to vote for the family-run way of managing the business, the board is attracted by the boost to the portfolio that an IPO would bring about. The possibility has been alluded to officially in 2013, with the proviso that the Saadé family would keep control.

== CMA CGM key figures ==
Key figures (*teus : twenty-foot equivalent units)
	CMA CGM 2016
Total revenue	USD 16.0 billions
Number of containers carried	15.6 million teus*
Total fleet vessel	489
Total fleet capacity	2.208M
Staff worldwide	29,000+ employees
Staff in France	4,500 employees
World ranking	3rd

Today, the CMA CGM Group is the world's 3rd largest container shipping company and No.1 in France. With a fleet of 489 vessels, it serves more than 420 ports worldwide and carried around 15.6 million TEUs (twenty-foot equivalent units) - estimated - in 2016. Present on all continents and in 160 countries through its 775 offices, it employs 29,000+ people including 4,500 in France. Revenue for 2016 is US$16.0 billion.
