= Saadé =

Saadé is a surname. Notable people with the surname include:

- Antoun Saadé, Lebanese philosopher, writer and politician who founded the Syrian Social Nationalist Party
- Eric Saadé, Swedish pop singer
- Jacques Saadé (1937-2018), French billionaire, founder of CMA CGM
- Rodolphe Saadé (born 1970), French billionaire, son of Jacques
