= CMA CGM Corte Real =

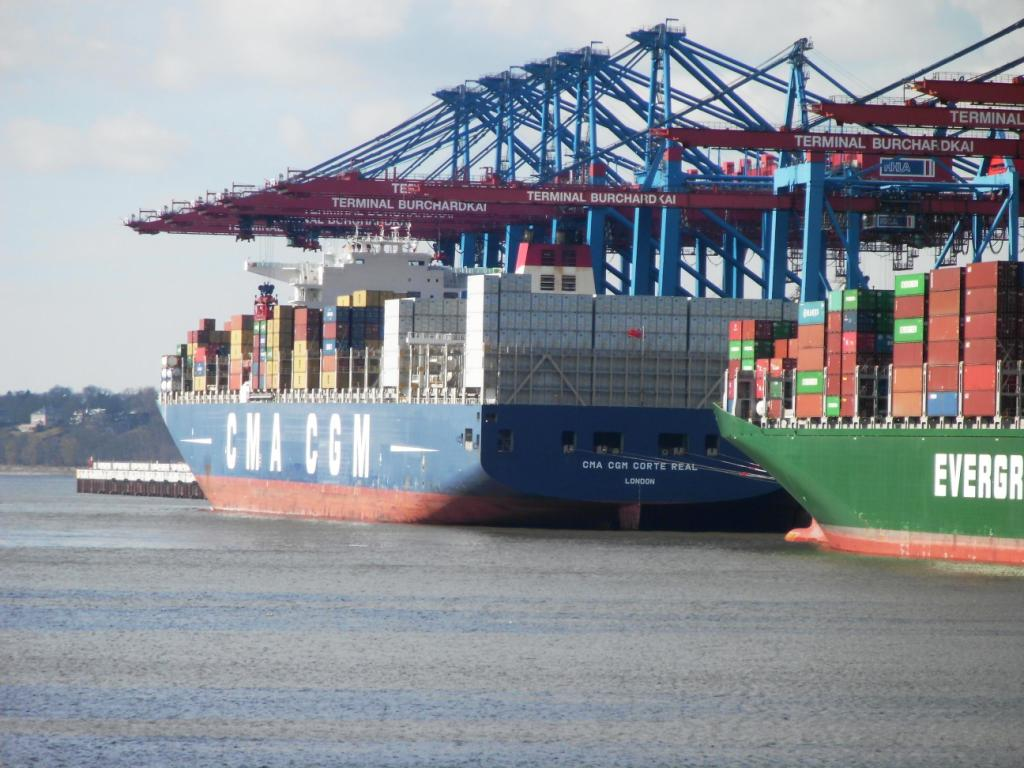
- La Corte Real à Hambourg sur Terminal Burchardkai 2013

History
- Name: CMA CGM Corte Real
- Namesake: Gaspar Corte-Real
- Operator: CMA CGM
- Port of registry: London, United Kingdom
- Builder: Daewoo Shipbuilding & Marine Engineering (DSME), South Korea
- Yard number: 4159
- Launched: 8 August 2009
- Completed: 16 August 2010
- In service: 2010
- Identification: IMO number: 9454400; Call sign: 2CXB8; MMSI number: 235076499
- Status: In service

General characteristics
- Type: Container ship
- Tonnage: 150,269 GT; 86,099 NT; 156,898 DWT
- Length: 365.5 m (1,199 ft)
- Beam: 51.2 m (168 ft)
- Draft: 16 m (52 ft)
- Depth: 29.9 m (98 ft)
- Installed power: Wärtsilä-Hyundai 14RT-flex96C (80,080 kW)
- Propulsion: Single shaft; fixed-pitch propeller
- Speed: 24.1 knots (44.6 km/h; 27.7 mph)
- Capacity: 13,800 TEU

CMA CGM Corte Real is the third Explorer class containership built for CMA CGM. It is named after Portuguese explorer Gaspar Corte Real. It was delivered in August 2010.
