= Amerigo Vespucci (disambiguation) =

Amerigo Vespucci (1451–1512) was an Italian explorer and cartographer.

Amerigo Vespucci may also refer to:

== Ships ==
- CMA CGM Amerigo Vespucci, a container ship built in 2010
- Italian corvette Amerigo Vespucci, a screw corvette of the Italian Navy
- Italian training ship Amerigo Vespucci, a tall ship of the Italian Navy
- SS Amerigo Vespucci, a Liberty ship built during World War II

== Other uses ==
- Américo Vespucio Avenue, an avenue in Santiago, Chile
- Amerigo Vespucci Airport, an airport in Florence, Italy
- Ponte Amerigo Vespucci, a bridge in Florence, Italy
