= CMA CGM Lapérouse =

Container ship built in 2010

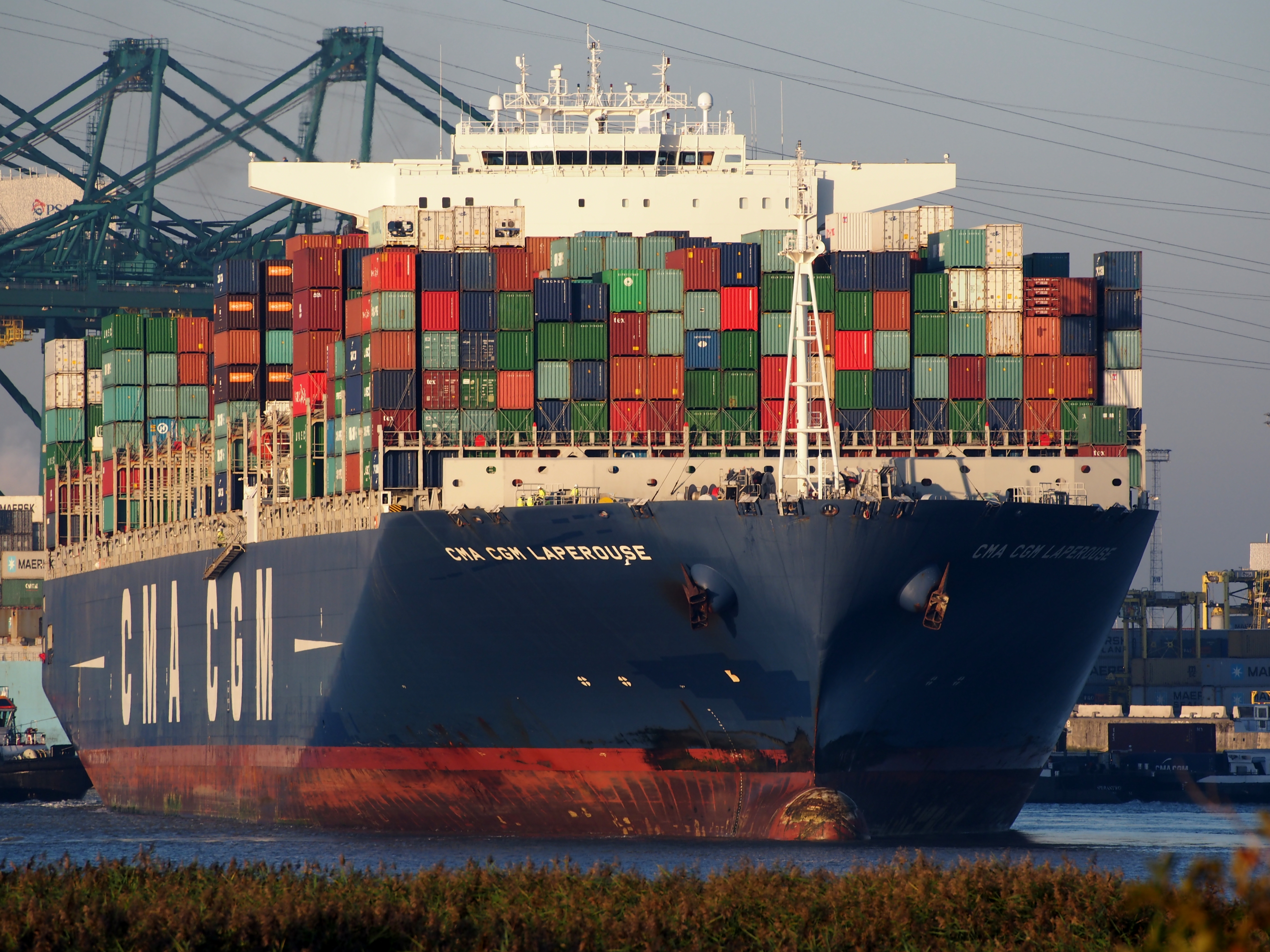
- CMA CGM Lapérouse 2015 in the port of Antwerp

History
- Name: CMA CGM Lapérouse
- Namesake: Jean-François de Galaup, comte de Lapérouse
- Operator: CMA CGM
- Port of registry: Marseille, France
- Builder: Daewoo Shipbuilding & Marine Engineering (DSME), South Korea
- Yard number: 4159
- Launched: 28 September 2009
- Completed: 10 September 2010
- In service: 2010
- Identification: IMO number: 9454412; Call sign: FLTH; MMSI number: 228345800
- Status: In service

General characteristics
- Type: Container ship
- Tonnage: 150,269 GT; 80,802 NT; 157,254 DWT
- Length: 365.5 m (1,199 ft 2 in)
- Beam: 51.2 m (168 ft 0 in)
- Draft: 16 m (52 ft 6 in)
- Depth: 29.9 m (98 ft 1 in)
- Installed power: Wärtsilä-Hyundai 14RT-flex96C (80,080 kW)
- Propulsion: Single shaft; fixed-pitch propeller
- Speed: 24.1 knots (44.6 km/h; 27.7 mph)
- Capacity: 13,800 TEU

CMA CGM Lapérouse is an Explorer-class container ship built for CMA CGM. It is named after French naval officer and explorer Lapérouse. Delivered in September 2010, it has a capacity of 13,800 TEU.
