= La Perouse =

La Perouse, La Pérouse, or Lapérouse may refer to:

== Places ==
- La Pérouse, French exonym for Perugia in Italy
- La Pérouse, old name of city of Tamentfoust, Algiers
- La Perouse, New South Wales, a suburb of Sydney
- La Perouse (New Zealand), a mountain in the Southern Alps of New Zealand
- La Perouse Bay, a bay on Maui, Hawaii
- La Perouse Bay, a bay on Easter Island (Rapa Nui) in Chile
- La Pérouse Strait, a strait between the Russia island of Sakhalin and the Japanese island of Hokkaido

== People ==
- Jean-François de Galaup, comte de Lapérouse (1741–1788), a French naval officer and explorer

== Ships ==
Named for the comte de Lapérouse:

- CMA CGM Lapérouse, a French cargo ship launched in 2010
- Lapérouse-class cruiser, a group of four wooden-hulled unprotected cruisers of the French Navy built in the mid-1870s and early 1880s
  - French cruiser Lapérouse, a French Navy cruiser launched at Brest in 1877
- Lapérouse-class survey ship, a class of hydrographic survey ships in the French Navy
  - French ship Lapérouse (A791), a French Navy serving ship of the Hydrographic and Oceanographic Service, launched at Brest in 1988

== Other uses ==
- Lapérouse (restaurant), restaurant in Paris
- Lycée Français de San Francisco, previously Lycée Français La Pérouse, a total immersion French language school based in San Francisco, California
