= Explorer-class container ship =

China/South Korea-built French cargo vessel

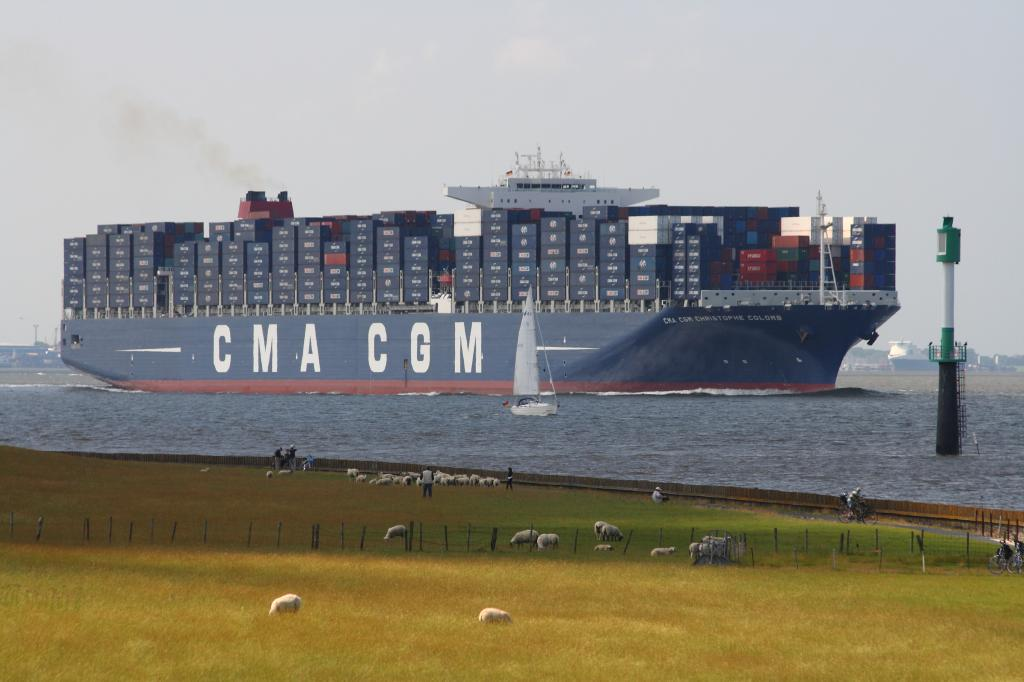
- CMA CGM Christophe Colomb, the first Explorer-class container ship ordered by CMA CGM

Class overview
- Builders: Daewoo Shipbuilding & Marine Engineering (DSME) and Samsung Heavy Industries, South Korea; Shanghai Jiangnan Changxing Heavy Industry, China
- Operators: CMA CGM
- Built: 2009–

General characteristics
- Type: Container ship
- Tonnage: 153,000–175,000 GT
- Length: 365–396 m (1,197 ft 6 in – 1,299 ft 3 in)
- Beam: 51 m (167 ft 4 in)
- Draft: 16 m (52 ft 6 in)
- Installed power: Wärtsilä 14RT-flex96C (80,080 kW)
- Propulsion: Single shaft; fixed-pitch propeller
- Speed: 24–25 knots (44–46 km/h; 28–29 mph)
- Capacity: 13,300–16,020 TEU

The Explorer class is a series of large container ships built for CMA CGM. The first five ships are 365 metres (1,197 ft 6 in) long with a nominal capacity of 13,830 TEU; the last three are larger, at 396 metres (1,299 ft 3 in) and 16,020 TEU, making them the world's largest container ships until the delivery of the Triple E class. Advanced simulators were built to help crews learn how to handle the new ships.

The ships are mostly named after explorers. Benjamin Franklin was not an explorer but made contributions to oceanography, Georg Forster was a naturalist and ethnologist who travelled with explorer James Cook, and Jules Verne was a novelist who wrote about explorations.

== Ships ==
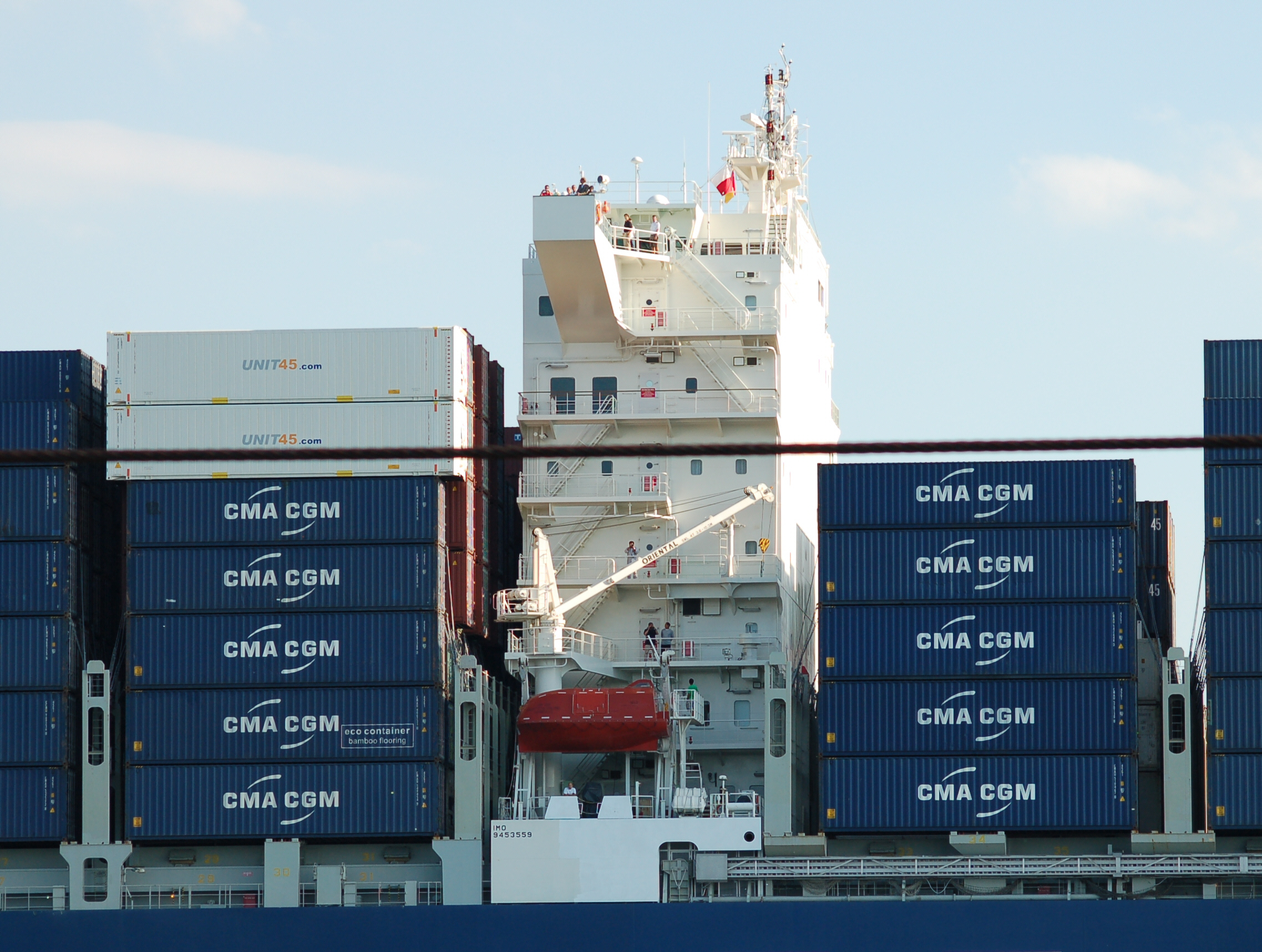
The superstructure of CMA CGM Cristophe Colomb

There exist four different ship types within the Explorer class.

No.	Ship	Yard number	IMO number	Delivery	Status	ref
Daewoo Shipbuilding & Marine Engineering (13830 TEU)
1	CMA CGM Christophe Colomb	4156	9453559	10 November 2009	in service	
2	CMA CGM Amerigo Vespucci	4157	9454395	21 July 2010	in service	
3	CMA CGM Corte Real	4158	9454400	16 August 2010	in service	
4	CMA CGM Lapérouse	4159	9454412	10 September 2010	in service	
5	CMA CGM Magellan	4160	9454424	28 September 2010	in service	
Daewoo Shipbuilding & Marine Engineering (16020 TEU)
6	CMA CGM Marco Polo	4161	9454436	5 November 2012	in service	
7	CMA CGM Alexander von Humboldt	4162	9454448	16 April 2013	in service	
8	CMA CGM Jules Verne	4163	9454450	30 April 2013	in service	
Samsung Heavy Industries (17722 TEU)
9	CMA CGM Kerguelen	2092	9702132	31 March 2015	in service	
10	CMA CGM Georg Forster	2093	9702144	2 June 2015	in service	
11	CMA CGM Bougainville	2094	9702156	25 August 2015	in service	
Shanghai Jiangnan Changxing Heavy Industries (17859 TEU)
12	CMA CGM Zheng He	H6001	9706906	11 September 2015	in service	
13	CMA CGM Vasco de Gama	H6002	9706889	27 July 2015	in service	
14	CMA CGM Benjamin Franklin	H6003	9706891	4 December 2015	in service	

== See also ==
- List of world's longest ships
- Triple E-class container ship
