= NRP Vasco da Gama =

The following ships of the Portuguese Navy have been named Vasco da Gama;

- Portuguese ironclad Vasco da Gama, an ironclad in service from 1878 to 1935.
- NRP Vasco da Gama (F478), a Bay-class frigate acquired from the United Kingdom, formerly HMS Mounts Bay, in service from 1961 to 1971
- NRP Vasco da Gama (F330), a frigate that entered into service in 1991

== See also ==
- CMA CGM Vasco de Gama, a container ship
- Vasco da Gama, a cruise ship
- Vasco da Gama-class frigate, a class of frigates of the Portuguese Navy
