= CMA CGM Notre Dame =

French LNG-powered container ship

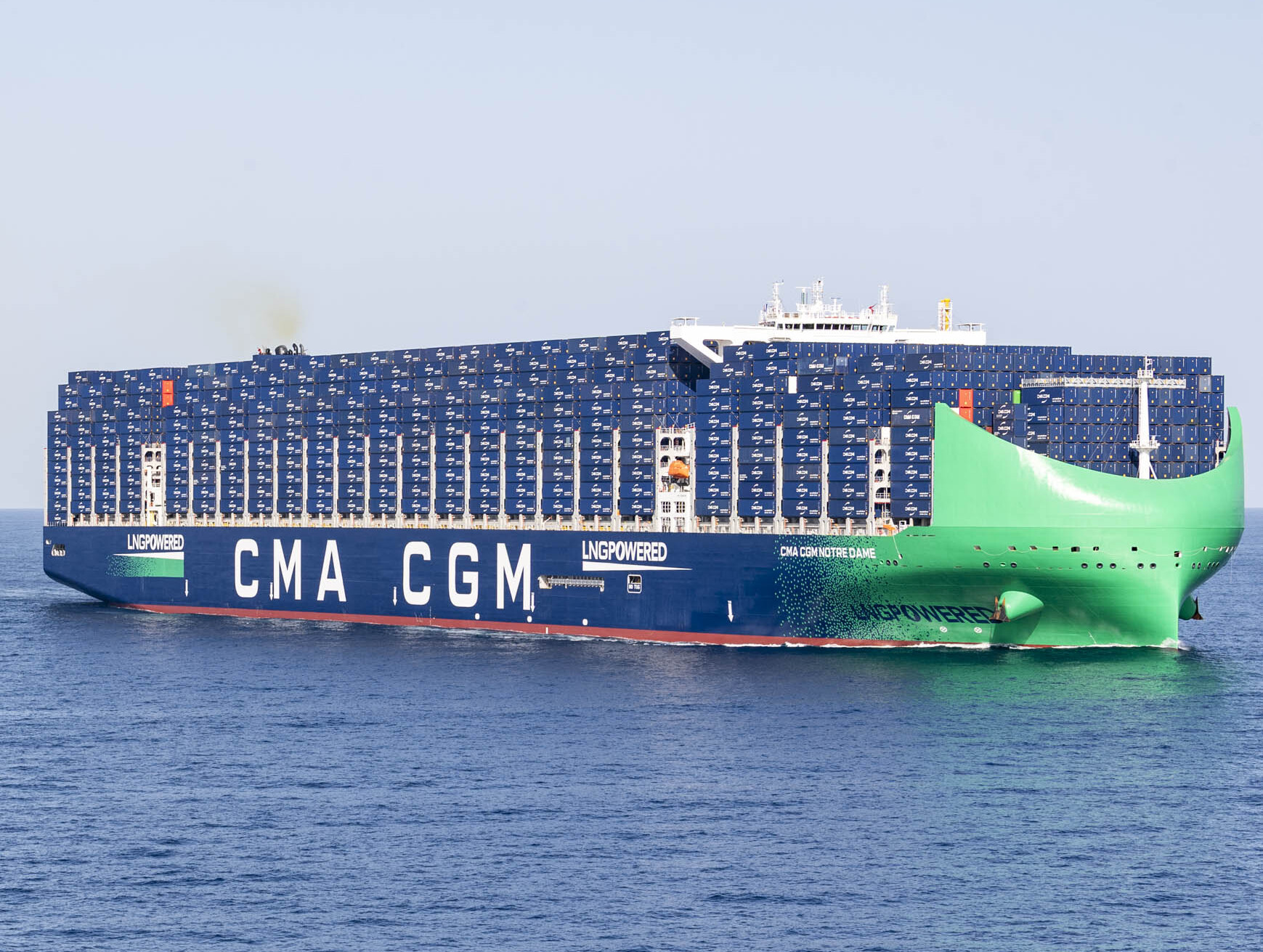
- CMA CGM Notre Dame

History
- Name: CMA CGM Notre Dame
- Namesake: Notre-Dame de Paris
- Operator: CMA CGM
- Route: Asia-Europe
- Completed: 2026

General characteristics
- Type: Container ship
- Tonnage: 236,463 GT; 233,345 DWT
- Length: 400 m (1,312 ft 4 in)
- Beam: 62 m (203 ft 5 in)
- Height: 75 m (246 ft 1 in)
- Capacity: 24,212 TEU

CMA CGM Notre Dame is a container ship built for CMA CGM. It is the first ship of its class. The ship is named after Notre-Dame de Paris. It is the largest vessel flagged in France.
