= Bow windshield =

Structure on a ship

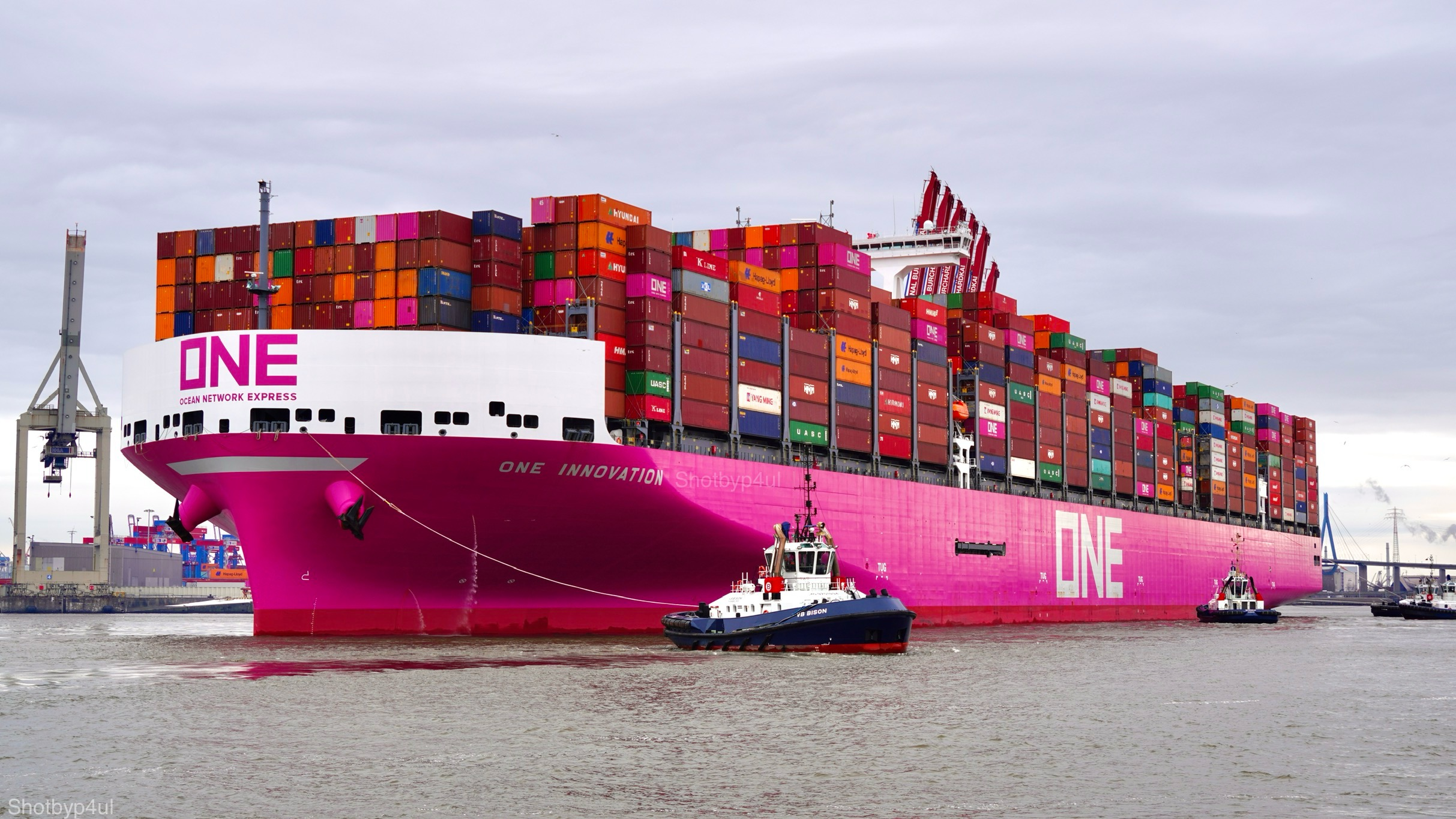
A cargo ship with a bow windshield fitted, painted in white.

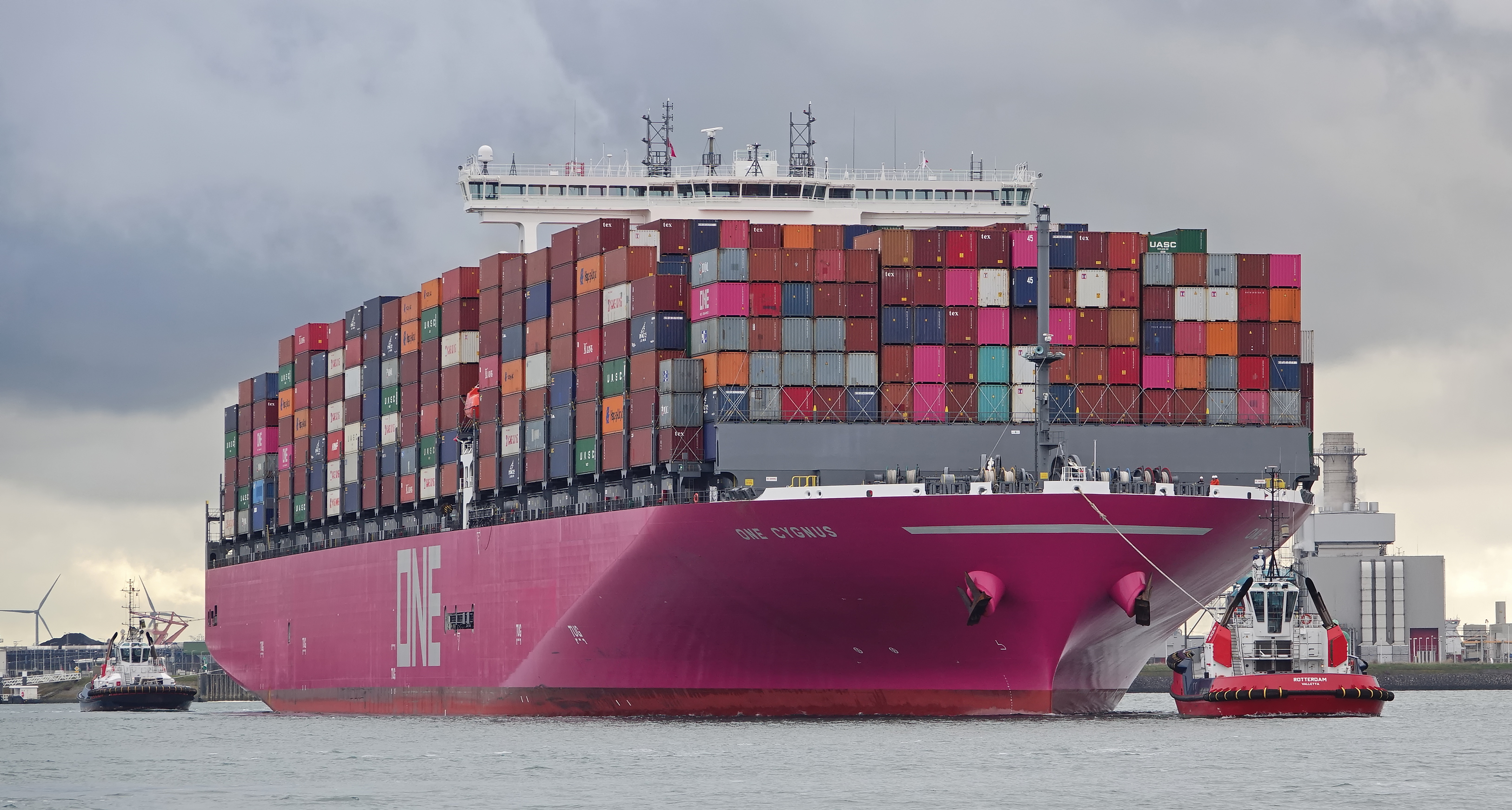
A cargo ship without a bow windshield. This vessel experiences greater drag and a worse fuel economy than the ship above.

A bow windshield, also known as a wind deflector, is a round and smooth structure mounted on the bow of a ship that improves a vessel's aerodynamic characteristics, allowing for greater fuel efficiency and a reduction of carbon emissions. The technology is limited to container ships, though is predicted to become more popular due to greater international emphasis on environmentalism.

== Concept ==
To be in motion, any object must need to overcome friction. For large container ships, between 2 and 10% of resistance encountered is caused by drag, which worsens a vessel's fuel economy as the additional friction requires more energy (in the form of fuel) to overcome. This issue is often exemplified by the blocky and un-aerodynamic shapes of a vessel's superstructure and by any containers carried on the deck. The aerodynamic shape of a bow windshield is intended to solve this problem, as it would allow air to flow around the ship's bow with less friction, thus decreasing the drag on the vessel. In turn, the decrease in friction would allow less fuel to be used to maintain speed, decreasing carbon emissions and the cost in fuel.

External image
- Vessel with a pronounced bow windshield
- https://web.archive.org/web/20240105013033/https://shipnerdnews.com/wp-content/uploads/2023/02/cma-windshield-jpg.webp

== History ==
The technology was first fitted on Mitsui O.S.K. Lines' container ship Mol Marvel in 2015, and within two years, the company reported that the device reduced her carbon dioxide emissions by 2%. Ocean Network Express, a joint venture by OSK Line and several other companies, operate ONE Trust and ONE Tradition, both of which have been fitted with a bow windshield. Outside of the company, CMA CGM's ship CMA CGM Marco Polo also features the design. With more stringent limits on carbon emissions set by the International Maritime Organization, the technology is predicted to become more common as companies risk ships being banned from international trade if their vessel exceed carbon emission limits.
