= CMA CGM Amerigo Vespucci =

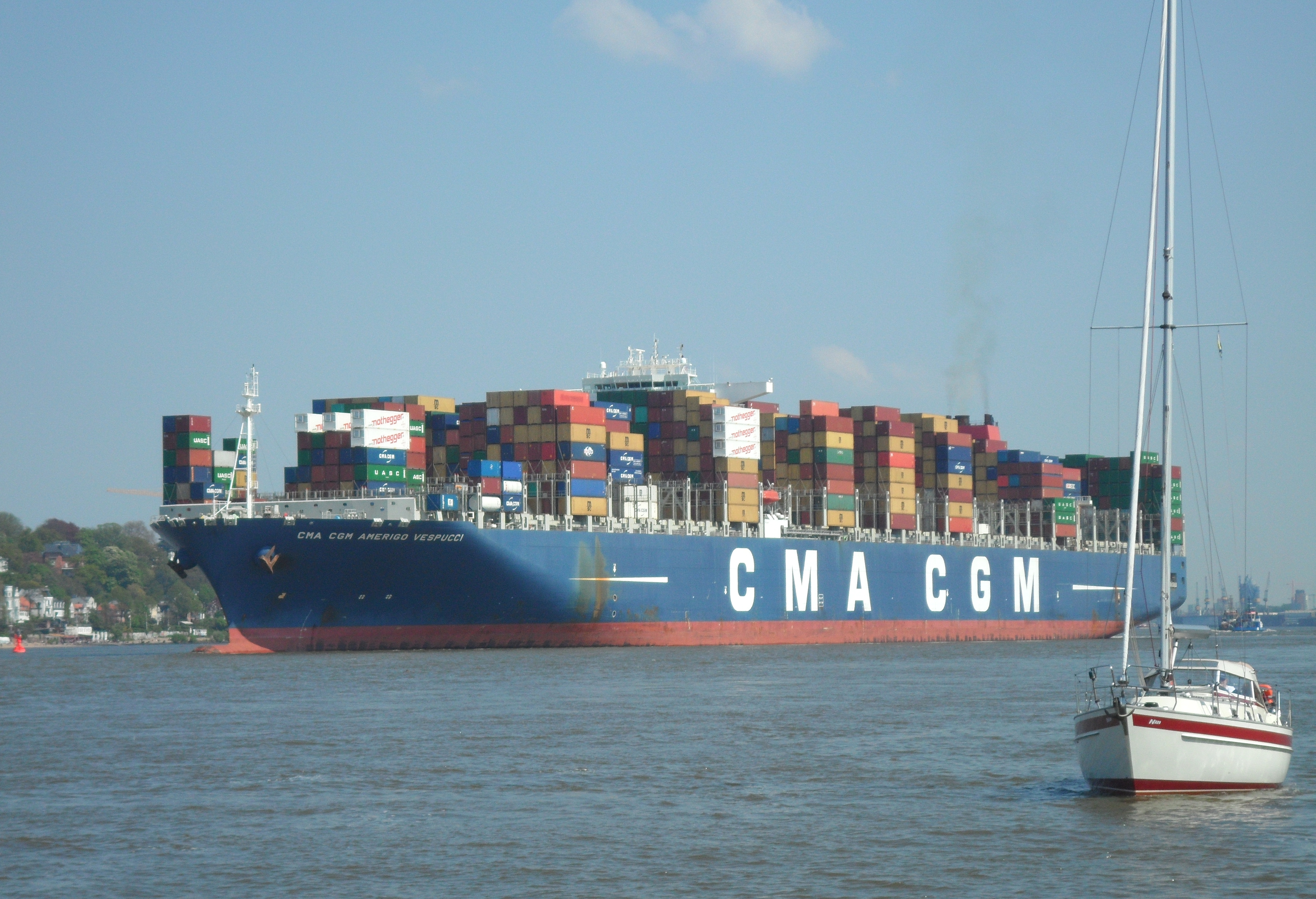

History
- Name: CMA CGM Amerigo Vespucci
- Namesake: Amerigo Vespucci
- Operator: CMA CGM
- Port of registry: Marseille, France
- Builder: Daewoo Shipbuilding & Marine Engineering (DSME), South Korea
- Yard number: 4157
- Launched: 13 June 2009
- Completed: 21 July 2010
- In service: 2010
- Identification: IMO number: 9454395; Call sign: FNVK; MMSI number: 228316800
- Status: In service

General characteristics
- Type: Container ship
- Tonnage: 152,991 GT; 81,900 NT; 156,887 DWT
- Length: 365.5 m (1,199 ft)
- Beam: 51.2 m (168 ft)
- Draft: 16 m (52 ft)
- Depth: 29.9 m (98 ft)
- Installed power: Wärtsilä-Hyundai 14RT-flex96C (80,080 kW)
- Propulsion: Single shaft; fixed-pitch propeller
- Speed: 24.1 knots (44.6 km/h; 27.7 mph)
- Capacity: 13,830 TEU

CMA CGM Amerigo Vespucci is an Explorer class containership built for CMA CGM. It is named after Italian explorer Amerigo Vespucci. It has a capacity of 13,830 TEU.
