= CMA CGM Alexander von Humboldt =

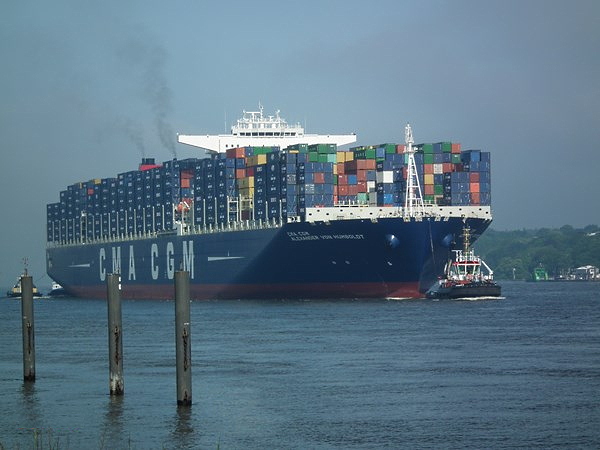
- CMA CGM Alexander von Humboldt ride up river Elbe in May 2013

History
- Name: CMA CGM Alexander von Humboldt
- Namesake: Alexander von Humboldt
- Owner: Caroline 31
- Operator: CMA CGM
- Port of registry: Valletta, Malta
- Builder: Daewoo Shipbuilding & Marine Engineering (DSME), South Korea
- Yard number: 4162
- Launched: 21 July 2012
- Completed: 16 April 2013
- In service: 2013
- Identification: IMO number: 9454448; Call sign: 2GEH4; MMSI number: 235096647
- Status: In service

General characteristics
- Type: Container ship
- Tonnage: 176,546 GT; 101,053 NT; 186,470 DWT
- Length: 378.4 m (1,241 ft)
- Beam: 53.6 m (176 ft)
- Draft: 16 m (52 ft)
- Depth: 29.9 m (98 ft)
- Installed power: Wärtsilä-Hyundai 14RT-flex96C (80,080 kW)
- Propulsion: Single shaft; fixed-pitch propeller
- Speed: 25.1 knots (46.5 km/h; 28.9 mph)
- Capacity: 16,020 TEU

CMA CGM Alexander von Humboldt is an Explorer class containership built for CMA CGM. It is named after Alexander von Humboldt.

CMA CGM had originally planned to name the ship after Portuguese explorer Vasco da Gama.

Scheduled for delivery in June 2013, it is among the world's largest containerships, at 16,020 TEU.
