= Straight-fourteen engine =

Fourteen-cylinder piston engine

A straight-14 engine (also known as a inline-14 engine) is a fourteen-cylinder piston engine with all fourteen cylinders mounted in a straight line along the crankcase. This design results in a very long engine, therefore it has only been used as marine propulsion engines in large ships.

The only straight-14 engine known to reach production is part of the Wärtsilä-Sulzer RTA96-C family of 6-cylinder to 14-cylinder two-stroke marine engines. This engine is used in the Emma Mærsk, which was the world's largest container ship when it was built in 2006. The engine produces 80,080 kW (107,390 hp) and displaces 25,340 L (1,546,342 in^{3}), has a bore of 960 mm (38 in) and a stroke of 2,500 mm (98 in). The engine is 27.3 m (90 ft) long, 13.5 m (44 ft) high and weighs 2,300 t (2,535 short tons).
