= CMA CGM Patagonia-class container ship =

Container ship class

Class overview
- Builders: Jiangnan Shipyard
- Operators: CMA CGM
- In service: 2021–present
- Planned: 5
- Completed: 5
- Active: 5

General characteristics
- Type: Container ship
- Tonnage: 154,077 GT
- Length: 366 m (1,201 ft)
- Beam: 51 m (167 ft)
- Draught: 16 m (52 ft)
- Capacity: 15,046 TEU

The CMA CGM Patagonia class is a series of 5 container ships being built for CMA CGM. The ships are built by Jiangnan Shipyard in China. The ships have a maximum theoretical capacity of around 15,046 twenty-foot equivalent units (TEU).

== List of ships ==
Ship	Yard number	IMO number	Delivery	Status	Ref.
CMA CGM Patagonia	2654	9894961	28 September 2021	In service	
CMA CGM Kimberley	2655	9894973	13 December 2021	In service	
CMA CGM Everglade	2656	9894985	10 January 2022	In service	
CMA CGM Galapagos	2657	9894997	27 June 2022	In service	
CMA CGM Greenland	2658	9895006	15 September 2022	In service	
Source: new-ships
