= CMA CGM Andromeda-class container ship =

Container ship class

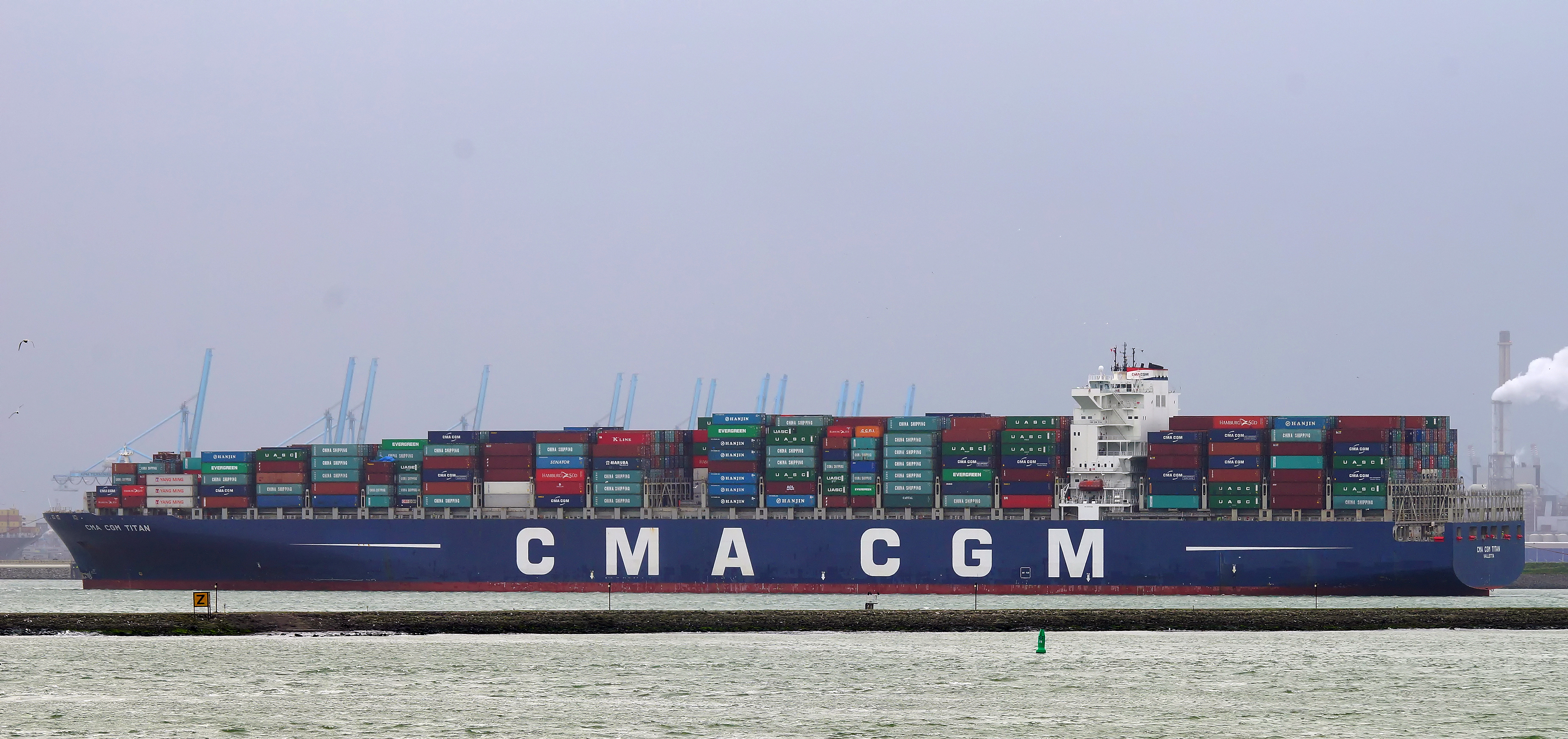
- CMA CGM Titan in the Port of Rotterdam

Class overview
- Builders: Hyundai Heavy Industries
- Operators: CMA CGM
- In service: 2009–present
- Planned: 12
- Completed: 12
- Active: 12

General characteristics
- Type: Container ship
- Tonnage: 131,332 GT
- Length: 363.6 m (1,193 ft)
- Beam: 45.6 m (150 ft)
- Draught: 15 m (49 ft)
- Capacity: 11,388 TEU

The Andromeda class is a series of 12 container ships built for CMA CGM. The ships were built by Hyundai Heavy Industries in South Korea. The ships have a maximum theoretical capacity of around 11,388 twenty-foot equivalent units (TEU).

== List of ships ==
Ship	Yard number	IMO number	Delivery	Status	ref
CMA CGM Andromeda	1992	9410727	18 March 2009	In service	
CMA CGM Aquila	1993	9410741	10 June 2009	In service	
CMA CGM Cassiopeia	1995	9410765	15 October 2009	In service	
CMA CGM Titan	1957	9399222	4 November 2009	In service	
CMA CGM Callisto	1994	9410753	2 July 2010	In service	
CMA CGM Libra	1954	9399193	16 July 2010	In service	
CMA CGM Centaurus	1996	9410777	23 July 2010	In service	
CMA CGM Columba	1997	9410789	23 July 2010	In service	
CMA CGM Leo	1955	9399208	26 July 2010	In service	
CMA CGM Pegasus	1956	9399210	31 July 2010	In service	
CMA CGM Gemini	1998	9410791	11 May 2011	In service	
CMA CGM Lyra	1999	9410806	20 May 2011	In service	
