= CMA CGM Jules Verne =

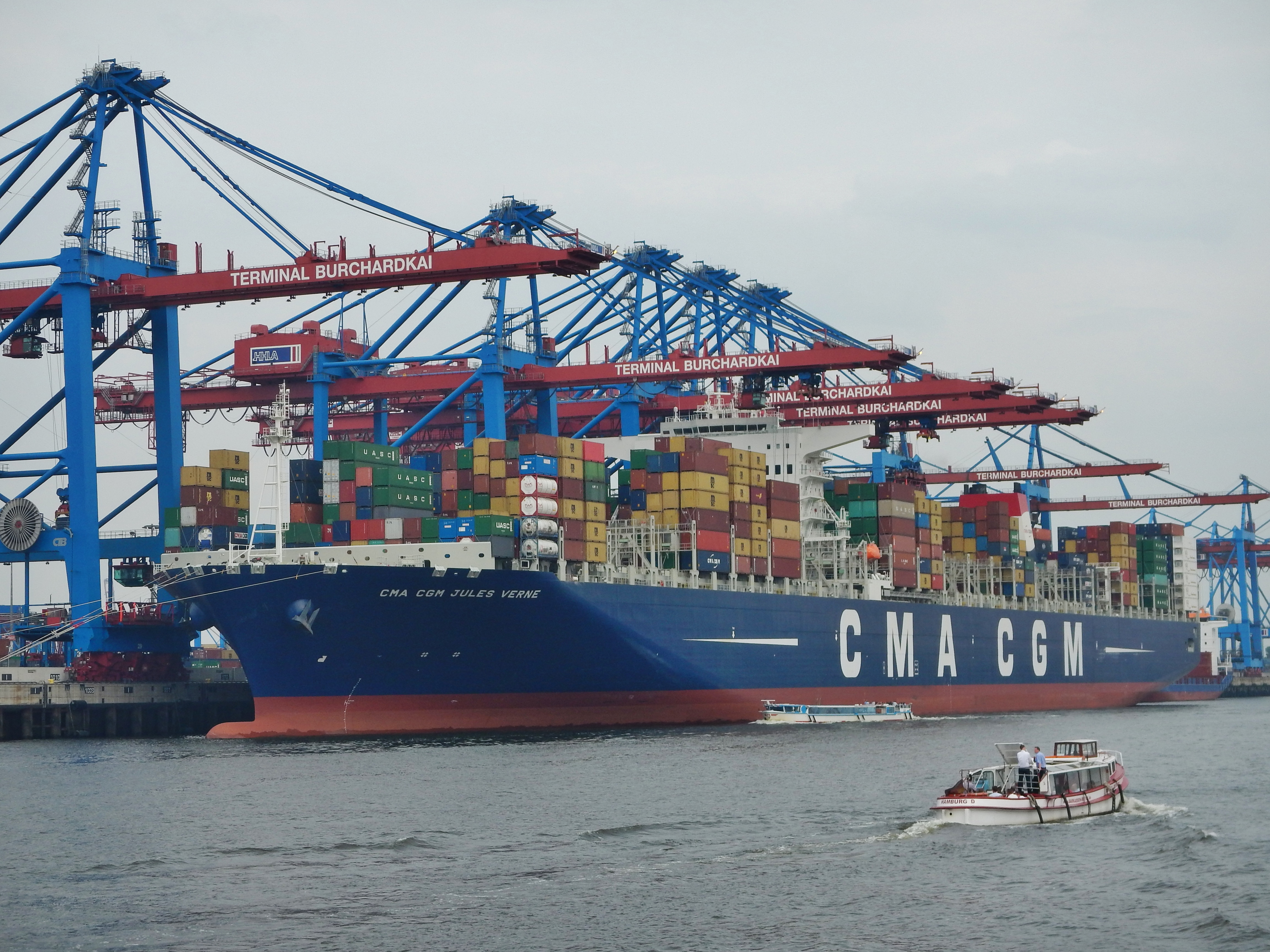
CMA CGM Jules Verne in Hamburg, 2013

CMA CGM Jules Verne (IMO 9454450) is an Explorer-class container ship built for CMA CGM. It was originally named after Chinese admiral and explorer Zheng He, but CMA CGM renamed it after the French writer Jules Verne. She is among the world's largest containerships, at 16,020 TEU.

== Specifications ==
- Length overall: 396 m
- Beam: 51 m
- Speed: 24 knots
- Capacity: 16,020 TEU.
- Engine: 14RT-Flex96C low speed diesel, 80,080 kW
