= CMA CGM Zephyr-class container ship =

Container ship class

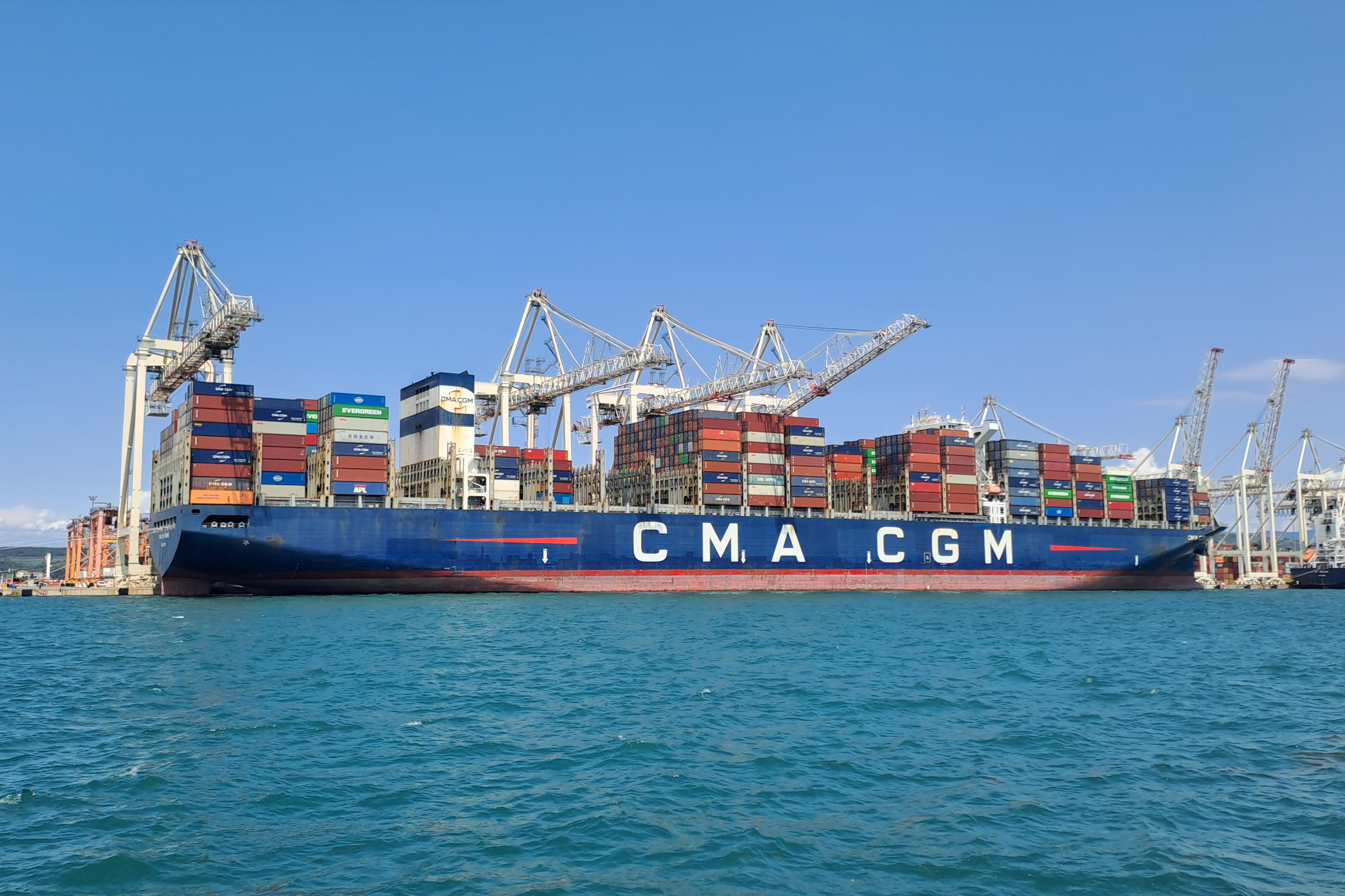
- CMA CGM Hermes stationed within the Port of Koper

Class overview
- Builders: Shanghai Jiangnan Changxing Shipbuilding
- Operators: CMA CGM
- In service: 2021–present
- Planned: 5
- Completed: 5
- Active: 5

General characteristics
- Type: Container ship
- Tonnage: 154,995 GT
- Length: 366 m (1,201 ft)
- Beam: 51 m (167 ft)
- Draught: 16 m (52 ft)
- Capacity: 15,536 TEU

The CMA CGM Zephyr class is a series of 5 container ships being built for CMA CGM. The ships were built by Shanghai Jiangnan Changxing Shipbuilding in China. The ships have a maximum theoretical capacity of around 15,536 twenty-foot equivalent units (TEU).

== List of ships ==
Ship	Yard number	IMO number	Delivery	Status	Ref
CMA CGM Zephyr	3038	9882487	27 August 2021	In service	
CMA CGM Hermes	3039	9882499	19 October 2021	In service	
CMA CGM Osiris	3040	9882504	24 November 2021	In service	
CMA CGM Apollon	3041	9882516	4 January 2022	In service	
CMA CGM Adonis	3042	9882528	4 March 2022	In service	
