= CMA CGM Marco Polo =

South Korea-built French-Bahamian cargo ship

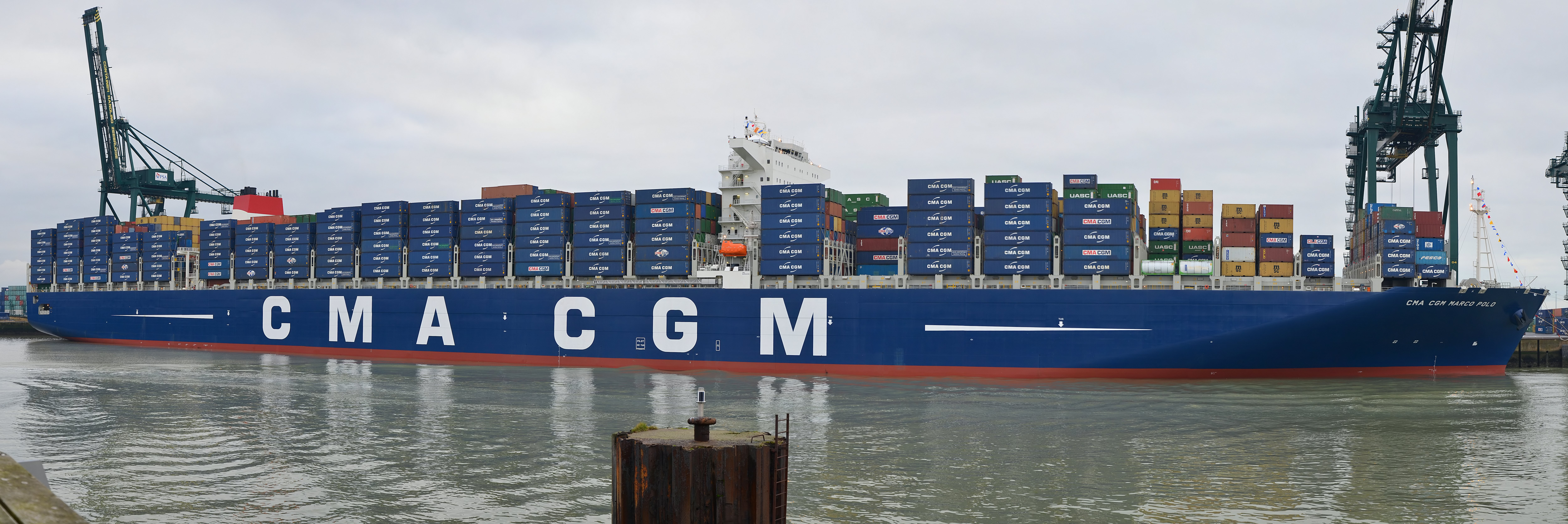
- CMA CGM Marco Polo in Zeebrugge, 18 December 2012

History
- Name: CMA CGM Marco Polo
- Owner: SNC Nordenskiold
- Operator: CMA CGM
- Port of registry: Nassau, Bahamas
- Builder: Daewoo Shipbuilding & Marine Engineering, South Korea
- Yard number: 4161
- Completed: 5 November 2012
- Maiden voyage: 7 November 2012
- In service: 6 November 2012
- Identification: Call sign: 2FYD5; IMO number: 9454436; MMSI number: 235095231
- Status: In service

General characteristics
- Class & type: Explorer-class container ship
- Tonnage: 175,343 GT; 85,361 NT; 187,625 DWT
- Length: 396.0 m (1,299 ft 3 in)
- Beam: 53.6 m (175 ft 10 in)
- Draught: 16.0 m (52 ft 6 in)
- Depth: 29.9 m (98 ft 1 in) (deck edge to keel)
- Installed power: Wärtsilä 14RT-flex96C (80,080 kW)
- Propulsion: Single shaft, fixed-pitch propeller
- Speed: 25.1 knots (46.5 km/h; 28.9 mph)
- Capacity: 16,020 TEU; 1,100 TEU (reefers)
- Crew: 27

CMA CGM Marco Polo is a Bahamas-registered container ship of the Explorer class owned by the CMA CGM group. On 6 November 2012, it became the largest container ship in the world measured by capacity (16,020 TEU), but was surpassed on 24 February 2013 by the Maersk Triple E class (18,270 TEU), which is 4 metres (13.1 ft) longer at precisely 400m in length.

It is named for Venetian merchant and traveller Marco Polo.

The previous largest was Emma Mærsk and her seven sisters of the Mærsk E class (15,500 TEU). The capacity is 10,000 TEU with an average payload of 14 tonnes, compared with 11,000 for Emma Mærsk and even more for the Triple E Class.

In May of 2021, she became the largest vessel to call at a Canadian port when she arrived at the South End Container Terminal in the port of Halifax, Nova Scotia.

In 2023, she was spotted with a bow windshield, an aerodynamic structure fitted on her bow that reduces drag and improves fuel efficiency. She was the first ship of the CMA CGM fleet to the fitted with the design, and the first ship outside of Japan to do so.

== See also ==
- List of largest container ships
- List of longest ships
