= SS Amerigo Vespucci =

American ship

History

United States
- Name: Amerigo Vespucci
- Namesake: Amerigo Vespucci
- Builder: Permanente Metals Corp., Richmond No. 2 Yard, Richmond, California
- Laid down: 20 February 1944
- Launched: 10 March 1944
- Fate: Scrapped, 1962

General characteristics
- Type: Liberty ship
- Tonnage: 7,000 long tons deadweight (DWT)
- Length: 441 ft 6 in (134.57 m)
- Beam: 56 ft 10.75 in (17.3419 m)
- Draft: 27 ft 9.25 in (8.4646 m)
- Propulsion: 2 × oil-fired boilers; Triple-expansion steam engine, 2,500 hp (1,864 kW); single screw
- Speed: 11.5 knots (21.3 km/h; 13.2 mph)
- Capacity: 9,140 tons cargo
- Complement: 41
- Armament: 1 × 4 in (100 mm) deck gun; Variety of anti-aircraft guns

SS Amerigo Vespucci (Hull Number 2767) was a Liberty ship built in the United States during World War II. She was named after Amerigo Vespucci, an Italian explorer for which North America and South America are named.

The ship was laid down on 20 February 1944, then launched on 10 March 1944. She was operated by the W. R. Chamberlin & Company from 1944 to 1946. In 1946 she was put in the reserve fleet. From 1954 to 1957 she was used by the West Coast Steamship company to store surplus grain. In 1958 she was put back in the reserve fleet. She was scrapped in 1962.
