= CMA CGM Vasco de Gama =

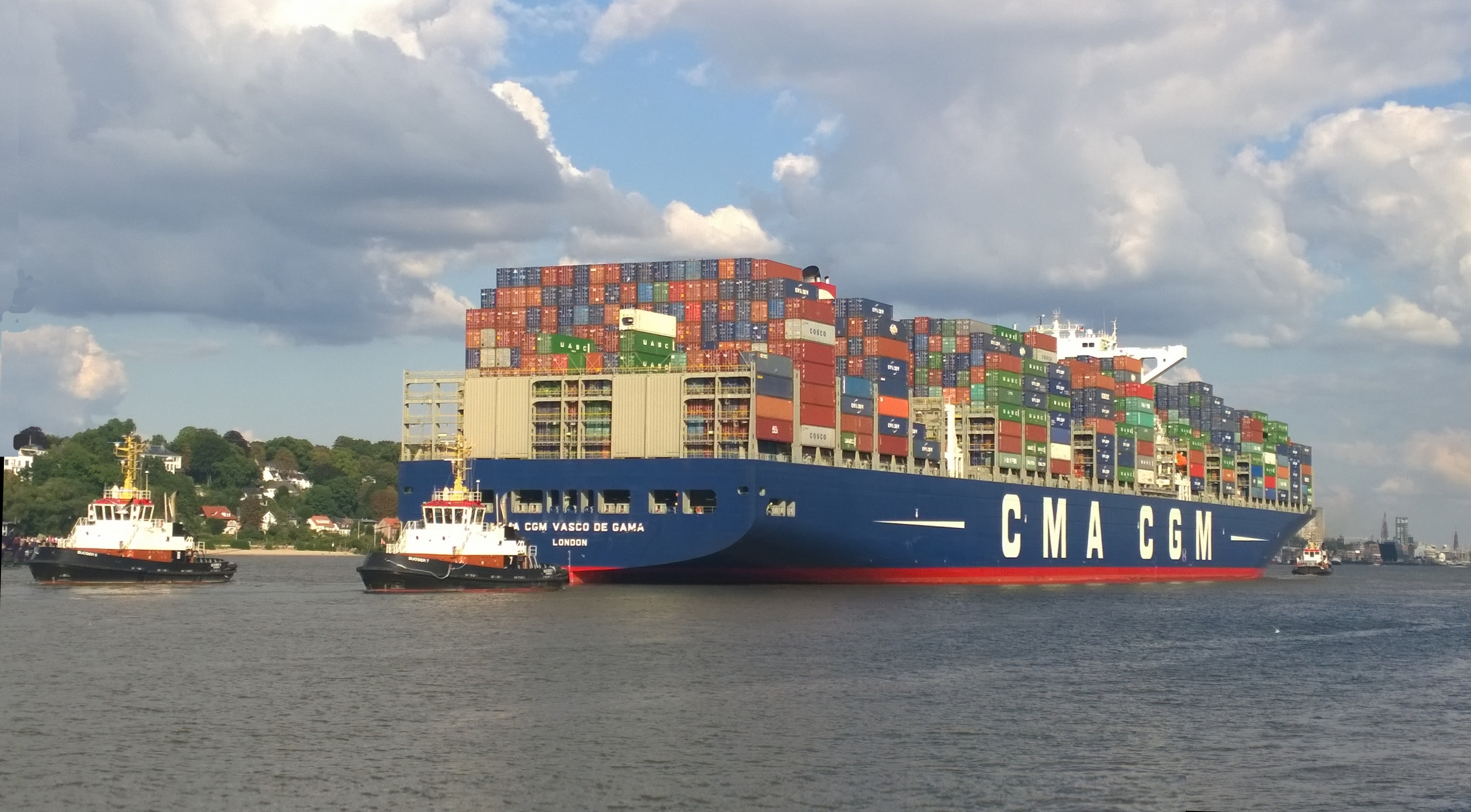
- CMA CGM Vasco de Gama ride up river Elbe in September 2015

History
- Name: CMA CGM Vasco de Gama
- Namesake: Vasco de Gama
- Owner: CHC Second Shipping SA
- Operator: CMA CGM
- Port of registry: London, United Kingdom
- Builder: Shanghai Jiangnan Changxing Heavy Industry, China
- Yard number: H6002
- Completed: 27 July 2015
- In service: 2015
- Identification: Call sign: 2INN8; IMO number: 9706889; MMSI number: 235111246
- Status: In service

General characteristics
- Type: Container ship
- Tonnage: 178,228 GT; 116,356 NT; 184,700 DWT
- Length: 399.2 m (1,309 ft 9 in)
- Beam: 54 m (177 ft 2 in)
- Draft: 16 m (52 ft 6 in)
- Depth: 29.9 m (98 ft 1 in)
- Installed power: MAN B&W, Licence Cssc Mes Diesel Shanghai diesel engine, (63,910 kW)
- Propulsion: Single shaft; screw propeller Solid
- Speed: 22.9 knots (42.4 km/h; 26.4 mph)
- Capacity: 17,859 TEU

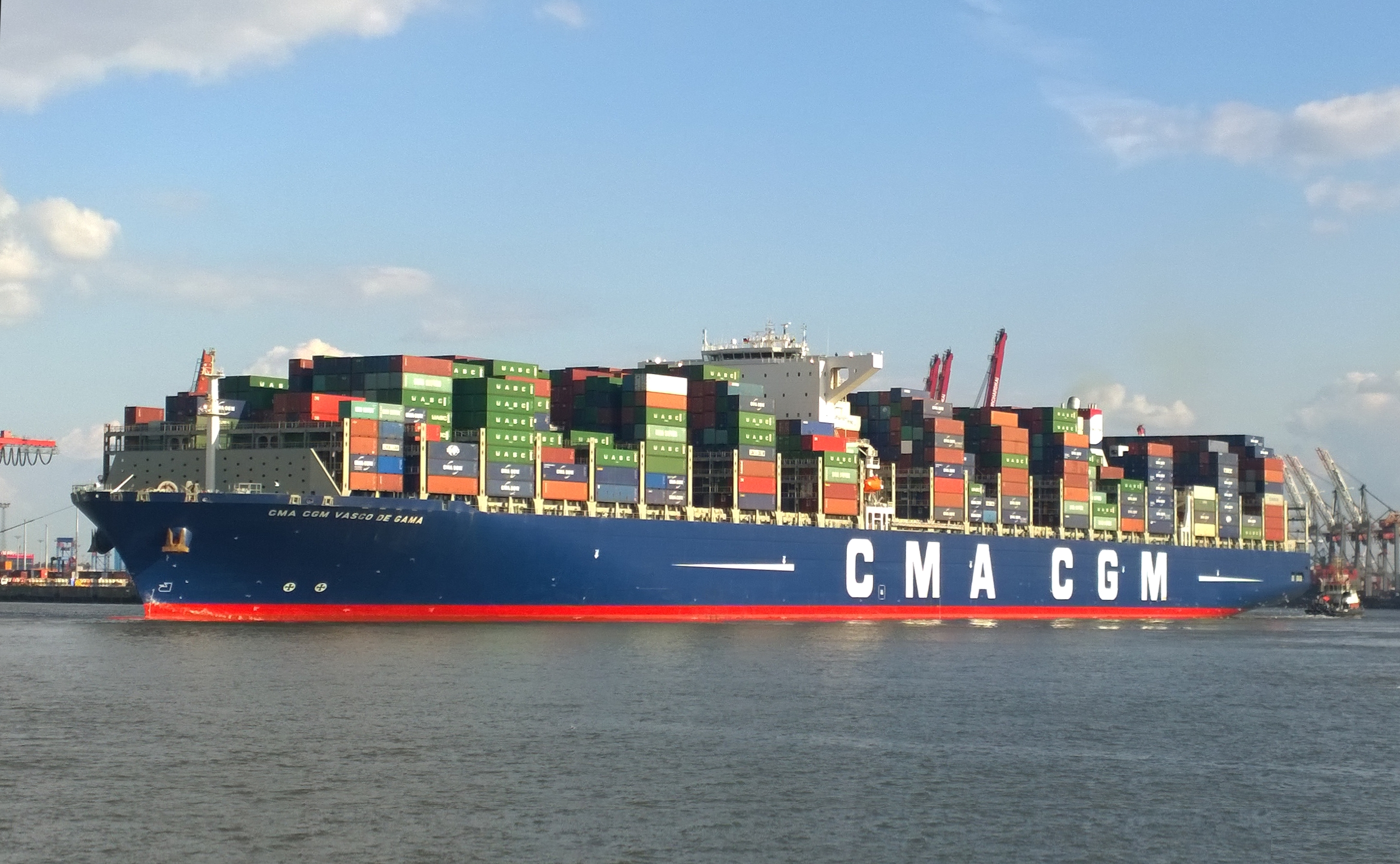
Container ship CMA CGM Vasco da Gama in the port of Hamburg in September 2015

CMA CGM Vasco de Gama is an Explorer-class container ship built for CMA CGM. It is named after Portuguese explorer Vasco de Gama.

CMA CGM had originally planned to name the ship after Benjamin Franklin.

The ship was delivered in July 2015, it is among the world's largest containerships, at 17,859 TEU.
