= CMA CGM Benjamin Franklin =

China-built Anglo-French cargo ship

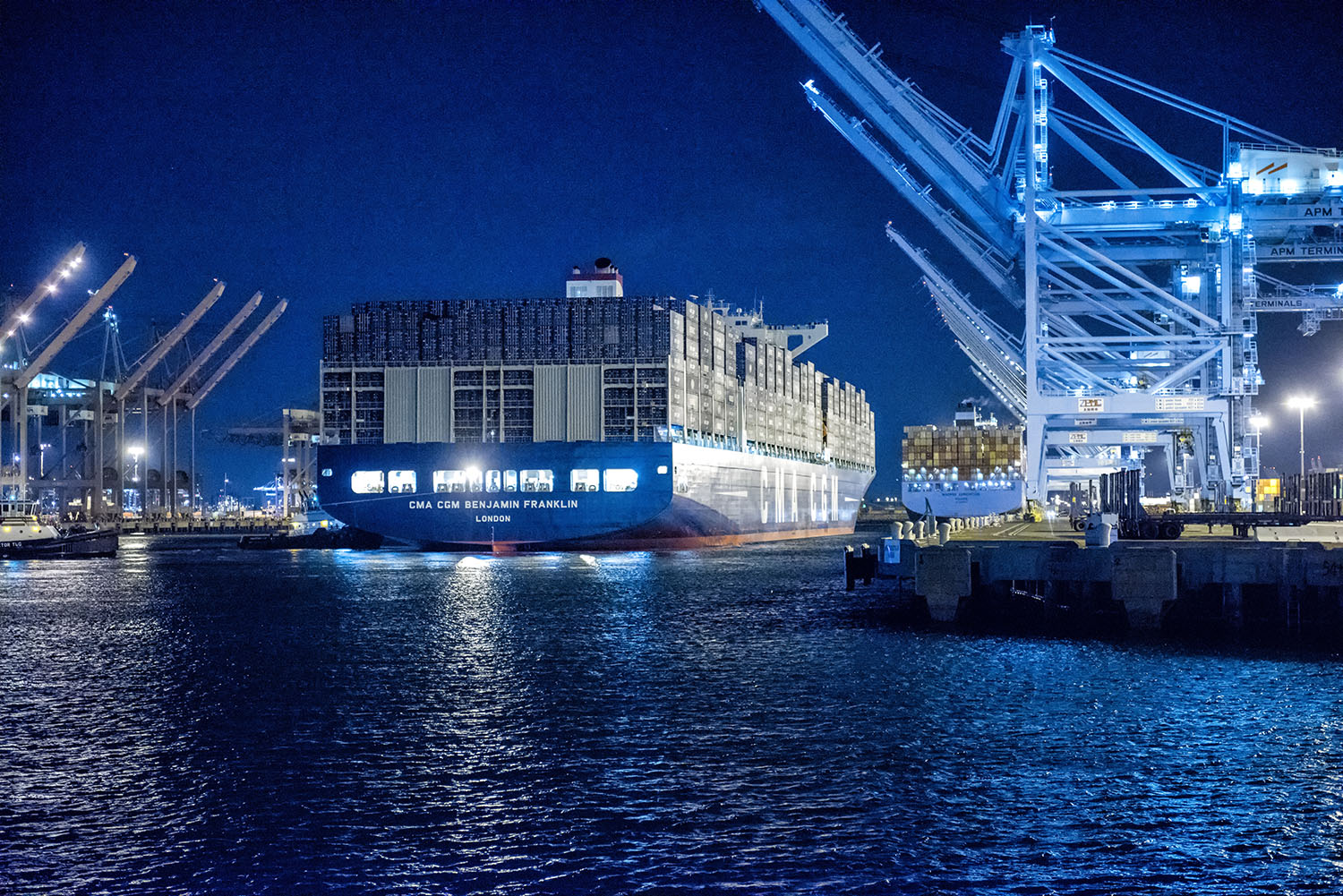
- CMA CGM Benjamin Franklin at the Port of Los Angeles

History
- Name: CMA CGM Benjamin Franklin
- Namesake: Benjamin Franklin
- Owner: CHC Second Shipping SA
- Operator: CMA CGM
- Port of registry: London, Great Britain
- Builder: Shanghai Jiangnan Changxing Heavy Industry, China
- Yard number: H6003
- Completed: 4 December 2015
- In service: 2015
- Identification: Call sign: 2IZK8; IMO number: 9706891
- Status: In service

General characteristics
- Type: Container ship
- Tonnage: 178,228 GT; 116,356 NT; 185,000 DWT
- Length: 399.2 m (1,309 ft 9 in)
- Beam: 54 m (177 ft 2 in)
- Height: 60 m (196 ft 10 in), 70 m (230 ft) over antennae.
- Draft: 16 m (52 ft 6 in)
- Depth: 30.2 m (99 ft 1 in)
- Installed power: MAN B&W diesel engine, (63,910 kW)
- Propulsion: Single shaft; screw propeller Solid
- Speed: 22.9 knots (42.4 km/h; 26.4 mph)
- Capacity: 18,000 TEU, Refrigerated connections 1,500
- Crew: 27

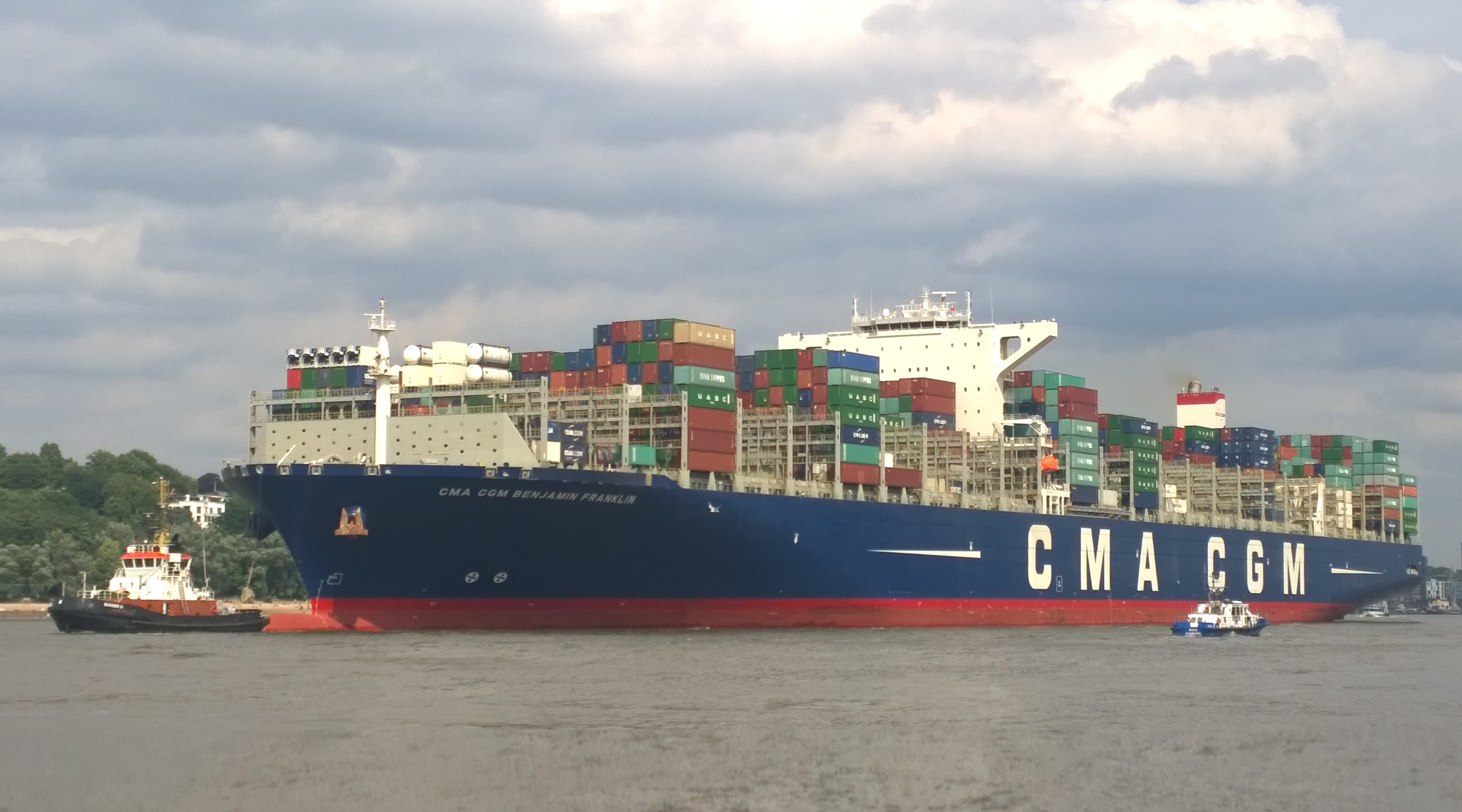
CMA CGM Benjamin Franklin leaves the port of Hamburg in July 2016

CMA CGM Benjamin Franklin is an Explorer-class container ship built for CMA CGM. Delivered in November 2015, she is named after Benjamin Franklin, one of the Founding Fathers of the United States. She is one of the largest container cargo vessels, capable of carrying 18,000 TEU.

== Routes ==
The December 26, 2015 arrival at the Port of Los Angeles marked the first time a ship of this size had been used in North America - previous routes for a ship this large were only from Asia to Northern Europe. CMA CGM Benjamin Franklin is about a third larger than the biggest container ships that typically visit the deep water ports of southern California. After departing Long Beach, she traveled north along the West Coast of the United States, arriving at the Port of Oakland near San Francisco on December 31, and at the Port of Seattle on February 29, 2016. The U.S. tour was short-lived, however, as CMA CGM postponed deployment of megaships to the West Coast in May 2016, citing a lack of demand.

In regard to U.S. port infrastructure, Marc Bourdon, president of CMA CGM American operations, states that while some ports are ready, most ports would have difficulty with such a large ship, and that ports would need to be modified before permanent large-scale implementation could commence. One such necessary modification is for the terminal cranes to be able to reach containers stacked to the full capacity of 10 high.

== Engine ==
The CMA CGM Benjamin Franklin is propelled by a MAN B&W 11S90ME-C9.2, a low speed, two-stroke diesel engine. The MAN B&W 11S90ME-C9.2 was designed in house by MAN B&W with the goals of the lowest possible operational costs and fuel consumption at any load and any prevailing condition. MAN B&W ME engines have design and performance characteristics in order to comply with International Maritime Organization Tier II emission regulations.

=== Concept of engine control system ===
This engine features electronic hydraulic activation to enhance flexibility in fuel injection and exhaust valve operation. These two factors are adjusted to align with the operating conditions that a ship may encounter. The electronic control of the entire combustion process, from start to finish, is referred to as the Engine Control System. Fuel injection regulates the engine's operating speed, while the exhaust valves manage the expulsion of combustion gases from the cylinder. The actuators for both fuel injection and exhaust valves are electronically controlled by the Engine Control System.

For fuel injection, a plunger powered by a hydraulic piston is initiated by oil pressure. This oil pressure is regulated by a valve that is electronically controlled through the Engine Control System. The exhaust valves are opened by a two-stage actuator, which is activated by oil delivered from an electronically controlled valve. By electronically managing these valves, the Engine Control System fully regulates the combustion process.

=== Intake and exhaust air ===
==== Cylinder ====
The frame of the cylinder is cast and equipped with access covers for the routine cleaning of the scavenge ports on the cylinder liner, which is a unique characteristic of two-stroke engines. The cylinder liner is made from alloyed cast iron and features scavenge ports along with drilled holes for lubrication.

==== Scavenge air system ====
Air intake takes directly from the engine room to the turbocharger fitted to the engines. From the turbocharger, air is sent to be cooled through a sea water cooler then stored in a scavenge air receiver. This air is then sent to the scavenge ports on the cylinder liners.

==== Exhaust gas system ====
Exhaust from the exhaust valves are sent to a receiver to equalize the different pressures produced from each cylinder. The exhaust gases are then sent through turbochargers.

== Environmental initiatives ==
The CMA CGM Benjamin Franklin was designed to meet CMA CGM's goals of a sustainable policy that aims to reduce greenhouse gas emissions and the protection of biodiversity. CMA CGM was able to improve its Carbon dioxide emissions by 50% since 2005.

=== Limited greenhouse gas emissions ===
- Through the electronically controlled fuel injection with the MAN B&W's Engine Control System, the consumption of fuel has been reduced by 3% and oil by 25% on average.
- At low loads, the main engine utilizes an exhaust by-pass system that improves energy efficiency through slow-steaming. When used at slow speeds, fuel consumption is reduced by an average of 1.5%
- Benjamin Franklin's hydrodynamics, or water flow, is improved with the addition of a bulbous shape on the rudder. This variation of the rudder, known as a twisting leading edge rudder, optimizes energy performance by 4%.

=== Biodiversity preservation ===
- Ballast water onboard the CMA CGM Benjamin Franklin is treated directly when pumped on board and again during ballast operations. The ballast water is filtered and passed under UV lamps so that water ejected at sea is totally cleared of any living organisms, in order to prevent them from invading natural habitats. There are no chemical products put into the sea with the Benjamin Franklin’s ballast system.
- For additional treatment of bilge, grey water, and engine water, the Benjamin Franklin is fitted with an additional decanting tank. This decanting tank is able to separate water from undesirable liquids, by letting all of the liquids settle. The waste products in the liquids are then removed and the remaining liquid is sent for further filtering.
- The Benjamin Franklin is fitted with CMA CGM's Fast Oil Recovery System, which is used to manage pollution on board the vessel.

== Issues of vessel size ==
=== Vessel size transformation ===
The initial deployment of large container ships was seen in the Asia-Europe trade. In the second half of 2010, the vessels in service with Maersk Line's Asia-Europe trade were 8,500 TEU. By 2013, the vessels in service for the Maersk Line's Asia-Europe trade increased to 18,000 TEU vessels. Until the CMA CGM Benjamin Franklin berthed in the Port of Los Angeles in late 2015, nearly all of the world's largest container ship (18,000+ TEU) were deployed in the Asia-Europe trade. However, 10,000+ TEU vessels represent only 10% of the total global fleet. In comparison, Maersk's Asia-Pacific trade vessels increased from 8,600 TEU to 9,400 TEU in August 2013.

=== U.S. ports ===
The average vessel size for U.S. port calls as of 2015 is less than 6000 TEU. However recently in 2016, container ships sizing from 12,000-14,000 TEU have been calling to U.S. ports in California. Notably, the CMA CGM Benjamin Franklin is the largest vessel to ever call to a U.S port. The Federal Maritime Commission has recognized the trend in increasing vessels size and U.S. ports have begun preparation in anticipation of the increased arrival of larger vessels. Major ports in the United States have begun dredging for 50 ft berth/channel depths and heightening their crane fleets in order to accommodate the arrival of larger vessels
