= Rodolphe Saadé =

Chairman of CMA CGM Group

- رودولف سعادة
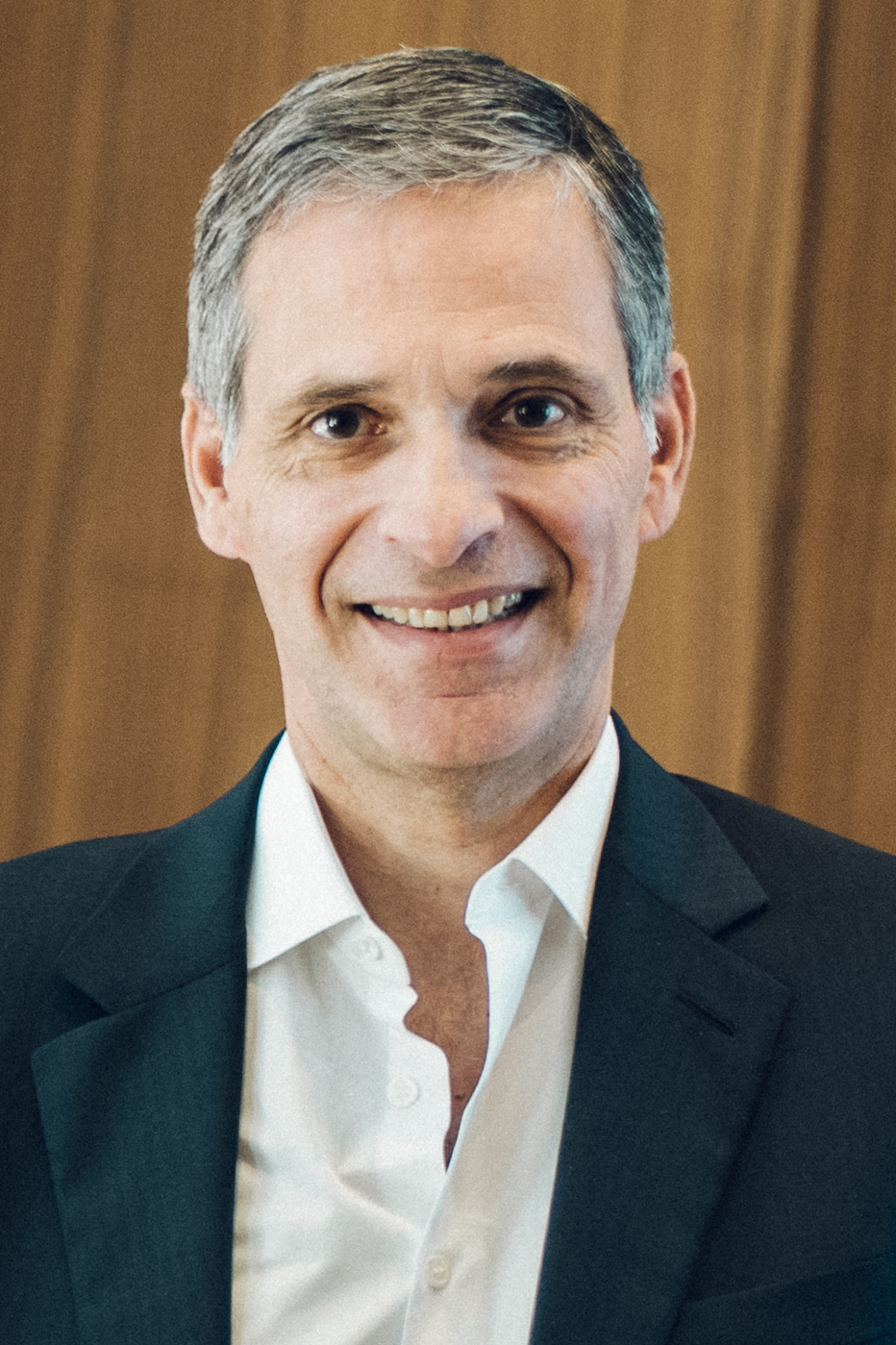
- Saadé in 2025
- Born: 3 March 1970 (age 56); Beirut, Lebanon
- Education: Concordia University
- Occupation: Businessman
- Title: Chairman of CMA CGM
- Predecessor: Jacques Saadé
- Children: 4
- Parent: Jacques Saadé (father)

Rodolphe Saadé (Arabic: رودولف سعادة; French pronunciation: [ʁɔdɔlf saˈade]; born 3 March 1970) is a Franco-Lebanese businessman. He is the chairman of CMA CGM, a world leader in logistics transport, and the son of its founder, Jacques Saadé. As of April 2024, his net worth was estimated at US$8.9 billion.

Saadé is a member of The Business Council in the United States.

== Biography ==
Rodolphe Saadé was born on 3 March 1970 in Lebanon, the son of Jacques Saadé. His Lebanese mother Naila Saadé (née Salem) was born in Beirut and is the sister of Farid Salem, co-founder of CMA CGM. After studying business at Concordia University in Montreal, he started his own water cooler company in Lebanon, Dynamic Concept. President and CEO of this distribution company, he acquires a first experience in international trade in Lebanon and Syria.

He put this experience to use by working for the CMA CGM Group, headed by his father, which he joined in 1994. He first held positions in New York and Hong Kong, then returned to the Group's head office in Marseille, where he took on increasingly important responsibilities between 1997 and 2004.

From 1997 to 2000, Saadé was successively Director of the United States - Mediterranean - Far East - Northern Europe and Far East - Northern Europe - U.S. West Coast lines.

Appointed Director of the Transatlantic and Transpacific line in 2000, he became Vice President of the same line in 2002.

In 2004, phe Saadé became General Manager and is in charge of developing the regular lines of the North-South Axis to North America, Central America, the Caribbean, South and West Africa, Australia and the Indian Ocean.

In 2006, following the takeover of Delmas by CMA-CGM in 2005, Saadé is leading the development of Delmas' lines in West, East and Central Africa and the Indian Ocean.

In 2008, Saadé invested in the development of services to Africa and the Indian Ocean, following which, he took over the management of Delmas, dedicated to African lines. That year, he played a key role in managing the hostage-taking of a Compagnie du Ponant cruise ship. He led the discussions with the kidnappers and helped to free the victims unharmed.

Two years later, he became Vice Chairman and member of the Board of Directors of the CMA CGM Group.

In November 2017, Saadé is appointed chairman and CEO of the CMA CGM Group.

In April 2018, under the leadership of Saadé, the Group took a 25% stake in Ceva Logistics at the time of its initial public offering. One year later, CMA CGM launched a public takeover bid for the company. With this acquisition, CMA CGM creates a global transport and logistics group. Saadé transfers CEVA Logistics headquarters from Switzerland to France, creating 200 jobs. He inaugurates it in November 2019, in the presence of French Prime Minister Edouard Philippe.

In August 2018, Saadé creates a start-up incubator in Marseille, called Zebox, in partnership with Accenture, BNP Paribas, EY, the forwarding agent Centrimex, the logistics specialist Ceva.

In August 2019, at the G7 meeting, Saadé announces his commitment to ensure that his container ships do not use the Northeast passageway, commonly known as the "Northern Route" and made accessible by global warming, in order to protect the biodiversity of the Arctic zone and to fight against global warming.

In May 2025, Saadé purchased a 20 percent stake in the French film studio Pathé.

== Awards ==
Saadé is a Knight of the French Legion of Honor since 2025.

== Personal life ==
Saadé resides in Marseille, France.
