= CMA CGM =

French shipping company

- CMA CGM's logo used since June 2017

- The CMA CGM Tower in Marseille, France
- Type: Private
- Industry: Freight transport
- Predecessor: Compagnie Maritime d'Affrètement (CMA); Compagnie Générale Maritime (CGM)
- Founded: 13 September 1978; 48 years ago
- Founder: Jacques Saadé
- Headquarters: CMA CGM Tower, Marseille, France
- Area served: Worldwide
- Key people: Rodolphe Saadé (Chairman & CEO); Tanya Saadé Zeenny (Director and Executive Officer)
- Products: Container shipping and terminals, logistics and freight forwarding, ferry and tanker transport
- Revenue: ▲$55.48 billion (2024)
- Operating income: ▲$13.45 billion (2024)
- Net income: ▲$5.71 billion (2024)
- Total assets: ▲$51.98 billion (2021)
- Total equity: ▲$23.91 billion (2021)
- Number of employees: 160,000 (2024)
- Subsidiaries: List of subsidiaries
- Website: cma-cgm.com

Compagnie maritime d'affrètement - Compagnie générale maritime, commonly known as CMA CGM, is a French ocean transportation and logistics company. Headquartered in Marseille, France, company operations include maritime transportation, port operation, supply chain management, and warehousing.

The company has a presence in 160 countries with 400 offices, 750 warehouses, 155,000 employees, and a fleet of 593 vessels. CMA CGM serves 420 of the world's 521 commercial ports and operates 257 shipping lines. CMA CGM is the third-largest container shipping company in the world. For the 2024 fiscal year, the company reported an annual revenue of US$55.48 billion.

The company was founded in 1978 by Jacques Saadé, and the name is an acronym derived from its two predecessor companies, Compagnie Maritime d'Affrètement (CMA) and Compagnie Générale Maritime (CGM), which translate to "Maritime Freighting Company" and "General Maritime Company", respectively.

== History ==
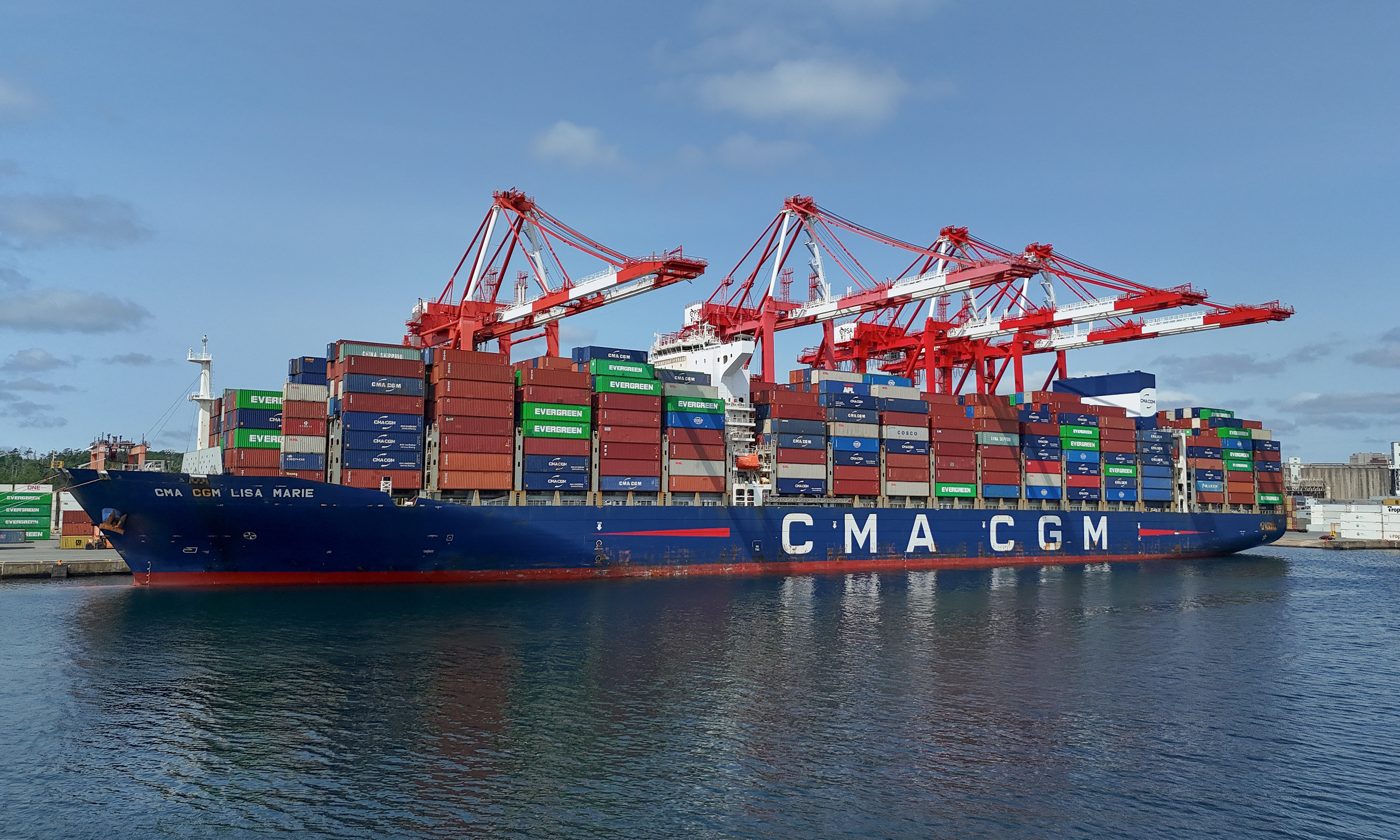
Container ship CMA CGM Lisa Marie berthed at Port of Halifax, Nova Scotia

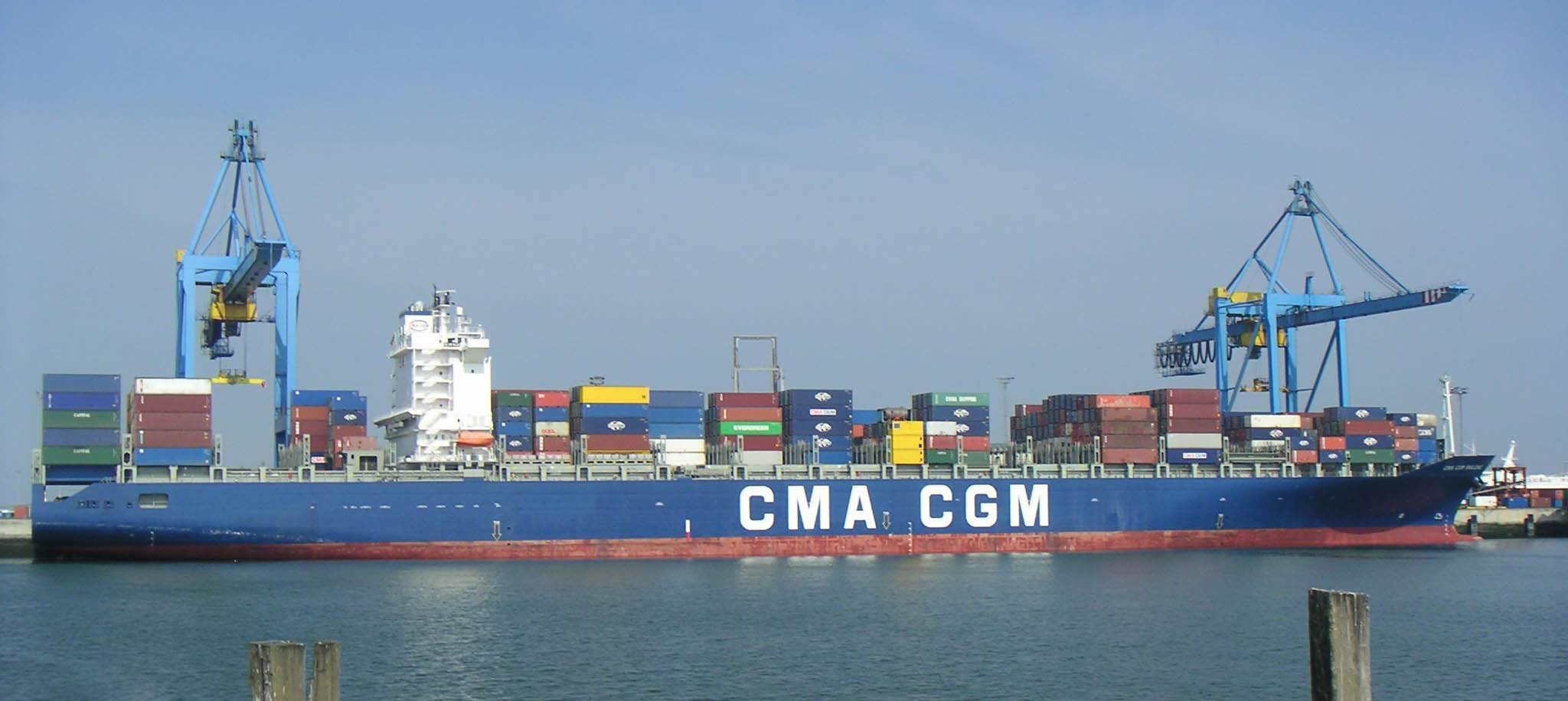
Container ship CMA CGM Balzac in the port of Zeebrugge, Belgium

The history of CMA CGM can be traced back to the middle of the 19th century, when two major French shipping lines were created, respectively Messageries Maritimes (MM) in 1851 and Compagnie Générale Maritime (CGM) in 1855, soon renamed Compagnie Générale Transatlantique in 1861. Both companies were created partly with the backing of the French State, through the award of mail contracts to various destinations, French colonies and overseas territories as well as foreign countries. After the two World Wars, the two companies became "State owned corporations of the competitive sector" (Entreprise publique du secteur concurrentiel), i.e., companies that, while owned by the State, were run as private for-profit businesses operating in competitive markets. The French government, under President Valéry Giscard d'Estaing and Prime Minister Jacques Chirac, progressively merged the two companies between 1974 and 1977 to form Compagnie Générale Maritime, which was still owned by the French government and still run as a competitive business, although sometimes subject to political pressure, for instance on the selection of shipyards to build new ships.

Compagnie Générale Maritime (CGM) operated as such from 1974 to 1996 when it was privatized by the French state under President Chirac and Prime Minister Alain Juppé. During these 22 years it operated freight and container liner services in various global trade lanes, as well as a fleet of dry bulk ships, and a few large oil tankers and Liquefied Natural Gas (LNG) tankers, with headquarters located in Paris' western suburbs, first in Paris-La Defense, then in close by Suresnes.

The CGM liner services, mostly containerized but also operating a significant fleet of "Con-Ro" vessels able to load roll-on/roll-off cargoes, were re-structured from the two parent companies' main trade lanes, i.e. Western trade lanes (Americas) for Compagnie Générale Transatlantique (CGT) and Eastern trade lanes (Asia, East Africa, Pacific, plus Eastern South America) for Messageries Maritimes (MM). After the merger and re-structure, CGM's liner services were managed in four distinct Trade Divisions, North America & Far East (AMNEO, for Amérique du Nord & Extrême Orient) which also managed the bulk and tanker fleets, South America & Caribbean (AMLAT), Pacific & Indian Ocean (PACOI) and Short Sea Trades (Cabotage).

Separately, Jacques Saadé had created CMA in 1978 as an intra-Mediterranean liner service operator, based in Marseille. In 1996, CGM was privatized and sold to Compagnie Maritime d'Affrètement (CMA) to form CMA CGM.

In 1998 the combined company purchased Australian National Line.

In September 2005, CMA CGM acquired its French rival Delmas based in Le Havre from the Bolloré Group for €600 million. The acquisition was completed in early January 5, 2006. The resulting corporation became the third largest container company in the world behind the Danish Maersk and the Swiss Mediterranean Shipping Company

In May 2007, a consortium represented by CMA CGM completed its acquisition of Compagnie Marocaine de Navigation (Comanav) for a sum of €200 million. In July 2007, CMA CGM acquired Cheng Lie Navigation Corp. (CNC Line), Intra-Asia container line based in Taiwan.

In 2009, CMA CGM acquired the Port of Latakia in Syria under a consortium comprising CMA CGM/Terminal Link and Souria Holding, a Syrian limited liability company.

In 2014, CMA CGM signs the Ocean Three agreements. The group strengthens its offer by signing major agreements on the biggest worldwide maritime trades with CSCL and UASC.

In April 2015, the group acquired a strategic stake in LCL Logistix, a logistics firm in India, via its subsidiary CMA CGM LOG. In December 2015, CMA CGM Benjamin Franklin called at the Port of Los Angeles and thus became the largest vessel ever to call the United States. The container-ship, 1,300 ft (400 m) long and 177 ft (54 m) wide, was inaugurated in Port of Long Beach on February 19.

In July 2016 CMA CGM finalized its acquisition of Singapore-based NOL (Neptune Orient Lines) and its container line APL (American President Lines) after an all-cash offer of US$2.4 billion. The takeover is CMA CGM's largest acquisition and the purchase added 12 percent market share to the CMA CGM group. The Singapore Exchange Securities Trading suspended trading of NOL shares at the end of the offer.

In June 2017, CMA CGM acquire Mercosul Line, a Brazilian shipping company specialized in multimodal door-to-door container transportation and logistics. In October 2018, CMA CGM finalized the acquisition of Finland-based container-transportation and logistics company Containerships.

In April 2019, CMA CGM completed its public tender offer to acquire CEVA Logistics. With this acquisition, the CMA CGM Group becomes 110,000 people strong with more than $30.3 billion in revenue. CEVA operational center is transferred in Marseille, France, where is located the Head Office of the CMA CGM Group. In September 2019, the world's first LNG-powered container ship is launched.

In March 2020, Rodolphe Saadé announced that CMA CGM was offering 200,000 FFP2 protective masks to France Health Agency to fight against the COVID-19 virus. In February 2021, CMA CGM Group completes its logistics offer by creating a new division dedicated to air freight: CMA CGM Air Cargo. With its four Airbus A330-200F cargo aircraft, this airfreight division links Europe to North America. The first flight from Liège to Chicago marks the debut of commercial operations.

In September 2021, CMA CGM announced a partnership with fellow Breton-based operator Brittany Ferries. The partnership involves a €25 million investment, plus a CMA CGM representative joining Brittany Ferries' supervisory board.

In May 2022, CMA CGM signed a strategic partnership with Air France-KLM to develop their air cargo capacities together. However, this partnership, implemented in April 2023, was terminated by mutual agreement in January 2024 without change in the 9% stake acquired by CMA CGM in the Franco-Dutch airline group.

In January 2024, CMA CGM made a takeover offer for Wincanton plc. In March 2024 CMA CGM withdrew the offer.

In January 2026, CMA CGM agreed to form a $10 billion joint venture with Stonepeak called United Ports. Upon completion, CMA CGM will own 75% of the venture and will seek to accelerate investments in US based ports. In the same month intermodal container operations of Freightliner in the United Kingdom were acquired (Freightliner operations in other countries remaining with their previous owner).

== Ownership ==
CMA CGM is 73% owned by Rodolphe Saadé and his family through Merit France SAS. The Turkish family-owned company Yildirim Holding has a 24% stake and French public sector investment bank Bpifrance has a 3% holding.

== Subsidiaries ==
=== Maritime activities ===
- Australian National Line (ANL) (specializes in Australia, New Zealand, Oceania and Asia container transportation)
- Compagnie Marocaine de Navigation (Comanav) (passenger ferry and container services from Morocco to Europe)
- Cheng Lie Navigation Corp. (CNC Line) (specializes in Intra-Asia container transportation)
- Mercosul Line (specializes on the East Coast of South America container transportation)
- Containerships (specializes in Intra-European container transportation)
- American President Lines (APL) (Singapore-based container line)

=== Terminal activities ===
- CMA Terminals Holding
- Terminal Link - container terminals developer and operator, ranked N°12 worldwide

Terminal Link terminals
City	Country	Port (Terminal)
Abidjan	Ivory Coast	Port of Abidjan (Terra Abidjan)
Antwerp	Belgium	Port of Antwerp (Antwerp Gateway)
Busan	South Korea	Port of Busan (Busan New Container Terminal)
Casablanca	Morocco	Port of Casablanca (Soma port)
Dunkirk	France	Port of Dunkirk (Terminal des Flandres)
Houston	United States	Port of Houston (Houston Terminal Link)
Kingston	Jamaica	Kingston Harbour (Kingston Freeport Terminal)
Laem Chabang	Thailand	Laem Chabang Port (Laem Chabang (International Terminal)
Le Havre	France	Port of Le Havre (Terminal de France and Terminal Nord)
Marseille	France	Marseille-Fos Port (Eurofos)
Montoir-de-Bretagne	France	Grand port maritime de Nantes-Saint-Nazaire
Malta	Malta	Malta Freeport (Malta Freeport Terminal)
Miami	United States	Port of Miami (South Florida Container Terminal)
Odessa	Ukraine	Port of Odessa (Odessa Terminal)
Qingdao	China	Qingdao Port (Qingdao Qianwan United Container Terminal)
Rotterdam	Netherlands	Port of Rotterdam (Rotterdam World Gateway)
Singapore	Singapore	Port of Singapore (CMA CGM-PSA Lion Terminal)
Tangier	Morocco	Port of Tanger Med (Eurogate Tanger)
Thessaloniki	Greece	Port of Thessaloniki Thessaloniki Port Terminal
Umm Qasr	Iraq	Umm Qasr Port CMA CGM Terminal Iraq S.A.S.
Vũng Tàu	Vietnam	Vũng Tàu Port (Vung Tau Container Terminal)

=== Intermodal activities and logistics ===
- Progeco (container: sales, leasing & repairing)
- CMA CGM Logistics
- Freightliner (UK intermodal operator)
- Rail Link (multimodal rail transport)
- River Shuttle Containers (Rhône – Saône axis containerised river transportation)
- Kingston Freeport Terminal LTD (Jamaican Transhipment Hub)

=== Support activities ===
- CMA Ships (a wholly owned subsidiary managing all fleet-related operations)

=== Air services ===
- CMA CGM Air Cargo, active since February 2021, operates a total of 4 Airbus A330-200Fs and 2 Boeing 777Fs.

=== CMA Média ===
- La Provence (news media)
- Corse-Matin (news media)
- La Tribune (news media)
- RMC BFM (Radio, television, magazines)
- Brut (digital media)

=== Transportation of Passengers ===
- La Méridionale (Operates four ferries (Pelagos, Kalliste, Piana, and Girolata) with weekly sailings to Corsica and crossings between Marseille and Morocco.)
- Brittany Ferries: (The group also holds an equity stake in this entity.)

== Joint ventures ==
- CMA Systems, a business entity in partnership with IBM involving development of new technologies like the cloud computing.
- Terminal Link, a joint venture between CMA CGM (51%) and China Merchants Port (49%).
- 5-year partnership with startup Mistral AI beginning in 2025 and focusing on artificial intelligence initiatives for customer service in shipping and logistics and factchecking for CMA CGM's media businesses. As part of the deal, CMA CGM will invest up to €100 million with Mistral.

== Fleet ==
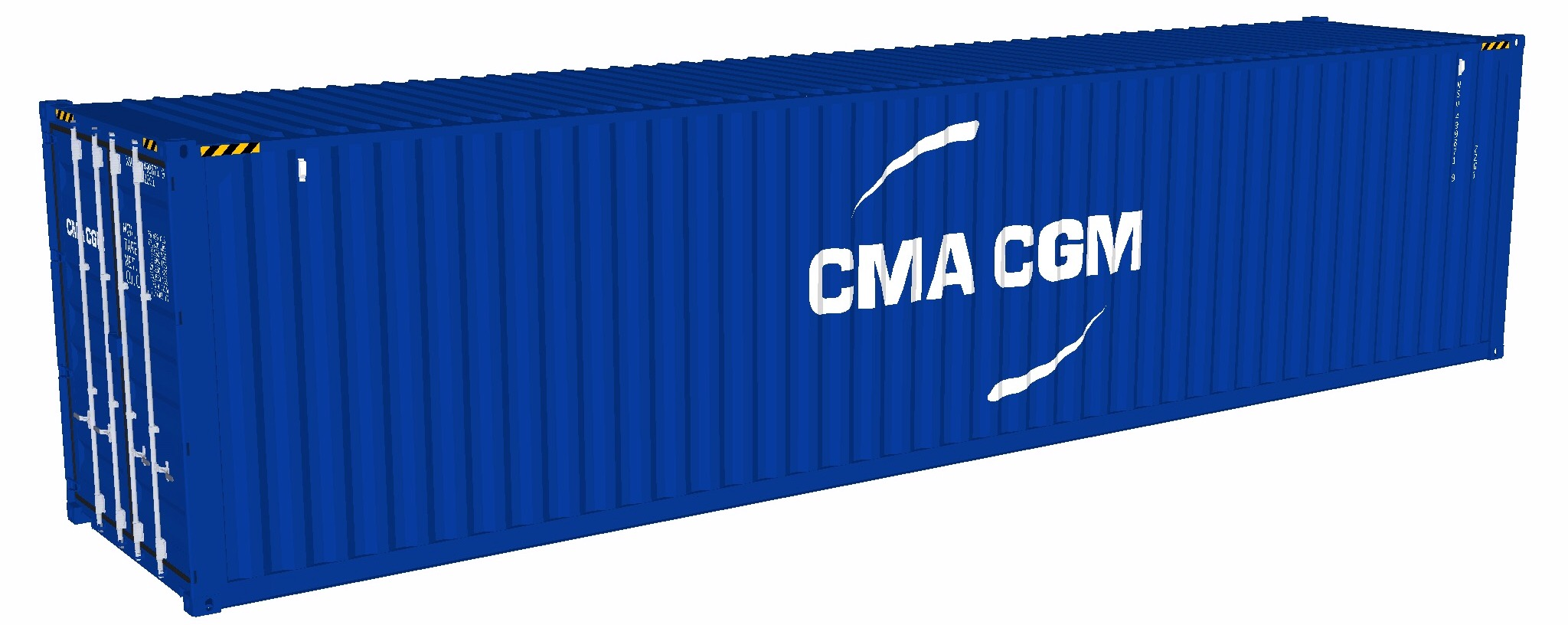
CMA CGM shipping container

In 2023, CMA CGM's fleet included:

- 593 vessels
- 4,500,000 container TEUs
- 600,000 reefer container TEUs

The fleet has 200 maritime services and calls at more than 420 ports in 160 countries. There are 521 commercial ports in the world at the moment.

Container ship classes of CMA CGM
Ship class	Built	Capacity (TEU)	Ships in class	Notes
CMA CGM 'Musician' class	2001–2004	5,782–6,600	8	
CMA CGM Vela class	2008–2009	11,262	4	
CMA CGM Andromeda class	2009–2011	11,388	12	
CMA CGM Explorer class	2009–2015	13,830–17,859	14	
CMA CGM A. Lincoln class	2017–2018	14,414	6	
CMA CGM Antoine de Saint Exupery class	2018	20,954	3	
CMA CGM Argentina class	2019–2022	14,812–15,052	17	Long-term charter from Eastern Pacific Shipping
CMA CGM Jacques Saadé class	2020–2021	23,112	9	
CMA CGM Patagonia class	2021–2022	15,000	5	
CMA CGM Zephyr class	2021–2022	15,000	5	
TBD	2023–2024	5,500	10	To be built by China State Shipbuilding Corp.
CMA CGM Bahia class	2023–2024	13,000	6	To be built by China State Shipbuilding Corp.
TBD	2023–2024	15,000	6	To be built by China State Shipbuilding Corp.
TBD	2024	2,000	10	To be built by Korea Shipbuilding & Offshore Engineering.
TBD	2024	7,600	6	To be built by Samsung Heavy Industries.
TBD	2024–2025	7,300	4	Biogas-powered container ships.
TBD	2024–2025	7,900	3	Biogas-powered container ships.
TBD	2025	8,000	6	To be built by Hyundai Samho Heavy Industries.
TBD	2025	13,000	12	To be built by Hyundai Samho Heavy Industries.
TBD	2025–2026	15,000	12	To be built by Jiangnan Shipyard and Dalian Shipbuilding.
TBD	2025–2026	16,000	6	To be built by Jiangnan Shipyard.
TBD	2025–2026	23,000	4	To be built by Hudong-Zhonghua Shipbuilding.
CMA CGM Notre Dame class	2025–2026	24,000	10	To be built by Yangzijiang Shipbuilding.
TBD	2027	9,200	8	To be built by Shanghai Waigaoqiao Shipbuilding.
TBD	2027–2028	18,000	12	To be built by New Times Shipbuilding. Long-term charter from Eastern Pacific Shipping.
TBD	2027–2029	22,000	10	To be built by Dalian Shipbuilding Industry Company.
TBD	2028	15,500	12	To be built by HD KSOE.
TBD	2028	18,000	12	To be built by Hyundai Samho Heavy Industries.
TBD	2028–2029	18,000	12	To be built by Jiangnan Shipyard.
TBD	2029–2031	1,700	6	To be built by Cochin Shipyard Ltd.
TBD	2029	6,000	8	To be built by Hengli Heavy Industry.

Some emblematic group's vessels are:

- CMA CGM Jules Verne (16,020 TEUs) was christened in June 2013 by the French President François Hollande. At that time, this vessel sailing under the French flag was the world's biggest container ship.
- CMA CGM Marco Polo (16,020 TEUs)
- CMA CGM Alexander von Humboldt (16,020 TEUs)
- CMA CGM Kerguelen (18,000 TEUs)
- CMA CGM Vasco de Gama (18,000 TEUs)
- CMA CGM Bougainville (18,000 TEUs)
- CMA CGM Georg Forster (18,000 TEUs)
- CMA CGM Zheng He (18,000 TEUs)
- CMA CGM Benjamin Franklin (18,000 TEUs)
- CMA CGM Antoine de Saint Exupery (20,800 TEUs)
- CMA CGM Jacques Saadé (23,112 TEUs); flagship and largest French-flagged container ship as of 2023

== Sponsoring ==
Since 2022, CMA CGM is the main sponsor of Olympique Marseille, the major football club of the city where the company is headquartered.

In July 2025, CMA CGM became the co-title sponsor of the Decathlon cycling team. The team will compete as Decathlon–CMA CGM from 1 January 2026.

== Accidents and incidents ==
On April 4, 2008, pirates seized the CMA CGM luxury cruise ship Le Ponant off the coast of Somalia.

CMA CGM and its affiliates have been implicated in various arms-shipping incidents.

- November 2009: South Africa seized arms traveling from North Korea by way of China. The seizure amounted to two containers filled with tank parts and other military equipment from North Korea, which included "gun sights, tracks and other spare parts for T-54 and T-55 tanks and other war material valued at an estimated $750,000." The military equipment was concealed in containers lined with sacks of rice and shipping documents identified the cargo as spare parts for a "bulldozer". According to the report, the containers were originally loaded in Dalian, China onto CMA CGM Musca, a UK-flagged container ship. The shipment was reportedly destined for Pointe-Noire in the Republic of Congo.
- July 2009: The United Arab Emirates seized a shipment of weapons from North Korea destined for Iran. The shipment was made in violation of UN Security Council Resolution 1874, which bans all North Korean Arms exports. The weapons, which included RPGs, detonators, ammunition, and rocket propellant, were shipped by a Bahamian-flagged vessel of ANL Australia, a wholly owned subsidiary of CMA CGM.
- October 2010: Nigerian authorities seized 13 shipping containers carrying illegal Iranian weaponry at Lagos' Apapa Port. The containers included 107 mm artillery rockets (Katyushas), explosives and rifle ammunition. The arms were to be shipped next to The Gambia, with the final destination of the cargo possibly the Gaza Strip. MV CMA CGM Everest originally picked up the containers from the Iranian port of Bandar Abbas. CMA CGM said it was the victim of a false cargo declaration, claiming the weapons were shipped in packages labeled as "glass wool and pallets of stone" and that the Iranian shipper "does not appear on any forbidden persons listing".
- March 2011: Israeli forces intercepted the vessel Victoria in international waters in the Mediterranean Sea, stating that it was carrying weapons by Iran via Syria. According to Israeli officials, the arms shipments included "roughly 2,500 mortar shells, nearly 75,000 bullets and six C-704 anti-ship missiles". Israel said the ultimate destination of the cargo was for the Hamas-controlled Gaza Strip. CMA CGM, which chartered the vessel, stated, "The ship's manifests do not show any cargo in contravention [of] international regulations, and we do not have any more information at this stage."

As a result of CMA CGM's involvement in Iranian weapons smuggling, US congressmen have called on CMA CGM to be investigated and urged the US Treasury Department to consider levying sanctions against the shipper. The company has since implemented tighter procedures for accepting shipments bound for Iran, including scanning all containers destined for the country. CMA CGM has also ceased exporting from Iranian ports since November 2011.

=== CMA CGM Centaurus ===
On 4 May 2017, the container ship CMA CGM Centaurus made heavy contact with the quay and two shore cranes while under pilotage during its arrival at Jebel Ali, United Arab Emirates. The accident resulted in the collapse of a shore crane and 10 injuries to shore personnel.

=== CMA CGM Washington ===
On 20 January 2018, the container ship CMA CGM Washington was on-route to Los Angeles, US, from Xiamen, China, when it experienced heavy waves in the North Pacific Ocean. The crew discovered that three bays, 54, 58 and 18, collapsed, which led to the loss of 137 containers and damage of another 85.

=== CMA CGM Norma ===
On 24 December 2018, the container ship CMA CGM Norma was involved in a collision with the China-flagged general cargo ship Yusheng366 in the waters south of Hong Kong. All the crew from Yusheng366 were rescued as they abandoned ship before she sank, while CMA CGM Norma suffered minor damages.

=== CMA CGM Rabelais ===
On 6 April 2022, a fire broke out in a container on the ship's deck on the 6,552 TEU CMA CGM Rabelais. The vessel was en route to Nhava Sheva, India, after departing Singapore and was navigating the Malacca Straits, some 100 km north-west of Port Klang, when the fire was discovered at about noon, local time. A spokesperson for vessel owner Danaos Corporation, said the master had “immediately implemented firefighting protocols” and emphasised that "the fire is still burning, but it is under control.” One crew member was injured during the firefighting operations, when he slipped and fell, breaking some ribs.

=== APL Vanda ===
On 3 July 2022, the Singaporean-flagged container ship APL Vanda was on-route between Singapore and Suez as part of CMA CGM's Asia - North-Europe Fal 3 service, when it lost 55 loaded containers in the Indian Ocean whilst the vessel was facing heavy weather, just before entry to the Gulf of Aden according to CMA CGM. No injury was reported and all crew members were safe. The ship, which left Singapore on June 26, stopped on July 9 in Djibouti "to clear some damaged containers on deck before safely continuing its voyage."

=== CMA CGM Symi ===
On 25 November 2023, US defense officials reported that the ship was targeted in a suspected Iranian drone attack while in the Indian Ocean, en route from Jebel Ali, United Arab Emirates to Port Klang, Malaysia. The ship has an Israeli owner and the incident happened a short time before the 2023 Gaza war ceasefire.

== See also ==
- List of largest container shipping companies
