= Wärtsilä-Sulzer RTA96-C =

Finnish marine diesel engine

RT-flex96C

Overview
- Manufacturer: WinGD
- Production: 2006–present

Layout
- Configuration: Two-stroke straight-14
- Cylinder bore: 96 cm (38 in)
- Piston stroke: 2.50 m (98 in)

RPM range
- Max. engine speed: 120

Combustion
- Turbocharger: Single
- Fuel type: heavy fuel oil

Output
- Power output: 80,080 kW (107,390 hp)

Dimensions
- Length: 26.59 m (87.2 ft)
- Height: 13.5 m (44 ft)
- Dry weight: over 2,300 t (2,535 short tons; 2,264 long tons)

The Wärtsilä RT-flex96C is a two-stroke turbocharged low-speed diesel engine designed by WinGD. It is designed for large container ships that run on heavy fuel oil. Its largest 14-cylinder version is 13.5 m (44 ft) high, 26.59 m (87.2 ft) long, weighs over 2,300 t (2,535 short tons; 2,264 long tons), and produces 80.08 MW (107,390 hp). It is the largest reciprocating engine in the world.

The 14-cylinder version first entered commercial service in September 2006 aboard the Emma Mærsk. The design is similar to the older RTA96C engine, but with common rail technology (in place of traditional camshaft, chain gear, fuel pump and hydraulic actuator systems). This provides maximum performance at lower revolutions per minute (rpm), reduces fuel consumption and emits lower levels of harmful emissions.

The engine has crosshead bearings so the always-vertical piston rods create a tight seal under the pistons. Consequently, the lubrication of the engine is split: the cylinders and the crankcase use different lubricants, each being specialised for its designated role. The cylinders are lubricated by continuous timed injection of consumable lubricant, formulated to protect the cylinders from wear and to neutralise the acids formed during combustion of the high-sulfur fuels commonly used. The crosshead design reduces sideways forces on the piston, keeping diametral cylinder liner wear down to about 30 μm per 1,000 hours.

As a piston descends, it compresses incoming combustion air for the adjacent cylinders. This also serves to cushion the piston as it approaches bottom dead centre, thereby removing some load from the bearings. The engine is uniflow-scavenged by way of exhaust valves that are operated by electronically controlled hydraulics, thus eliminating the camshaft.

As of 2006, more than 300 RT-flex96C engines and older RTA96C engines were in service or on order.

== Technical data (as of 2008) ==
Configuration	Turbocharged two-stroke diesel straight engine, 6 to 14 cylinders
Bore	960 mm (38 in)
Stroke	2,500 mm (8.2 ft)
Displacement	1,828.7 litres (111,590 in^{3}) per cylinder
Engine speed	15–102 RPM
Mean effective pressure	1.96 MPa (284 psi) @ full load, 1.37 MPa (199 psi) @ maximum efficiency (85% load)
Mean piston speed	8.5 m/s (28 ft/s)
Brake specific fuel consumption	171 g/(kW·h) (Note: 85% load, R2 operating point : max speed, lowest power)
Power	Up to 5,720 kW per cylinder, 34,320–80,080 kW (46,020–107,390 bhp) total
Torque	Up to 7,603,850 N⋅m (5,608,310 lbf⋅ft) @ 102 rpm
Specific power	29.6–34.8 kW (39.7–46.7 bhp) per tonne, 2,300 tonnes for the 14-cylinder version
Mass of fuel injected per cylinder per cycle	~160 g (5.6 oz) @ full load (Whole engine uses up to 250 tons of fuel per day.)
Crankshaft weight	300 t (660,000 lb)
Piston weight	5.5 t (12,000 lb)
Piston height	6 m (20 ft)

== See also ==
- Forced induction
- History of the internal combustion engine
