= List of largest ships by gross tonnage =

Depending on design requirements, some ships have extremely large internal volumes in order to serve their duties. Gross tonnage is a monotonic and 1-to-1 function of the ship's internal structural volume. It does not include removable objects placed outside the deck or superstructure, like the shipping containers of a container ship.

== Overall listing ==
Name	Class	Type	Length	Beam	Draft	Gross tonnage	Status	Main builder	Operator	ref
Pioneering Spirit	-	Crane vessel	382 m (1,253 ft)	124 m (407 ft)	10–15 m (33–49 ft)	403,342	In service	Daewoo Shipbuilding & Marine Engineering	Allseas	
Prelude FLNG	-	Floating production storage and offloading	488 m (1,601 ft)	74 m (243 ft)	17 m (56 ft)	300,000	In service	Samsung Heavy Industries	Shell plc	
Bellamya	Batillus class	Supertanker	414.22 m (1,359.0 ft)	63.01 m (206.7 ft)	28.50 m (93.5 ft)	275,276	Scrapped	Chantiers de l'Atlantique	Société Maritime Shell France	
Batillus	Batillus class	Supertanker	414.22 m (1,359.0 ft)	63.01 m (206.7 ft)	28.50 m (93.5 ft)	275,268	Scrapped	Chantiers de l'Atlantique	Société Maritime Shell France	
Pierre Guillaumat÷	Batillus class	Supertanker	414.22 m (1,359.0 ft)	63.01 m (206.7 ft)	28.50 m (93.5 ft)	274,838	Scrapped	Chantiers de l'Atlantique	Cie Nationale de Nav	
Prairial	Batillus class	Supertanker	414.22 m (1,359.0 ft)	63.01 m (206.7 ft)	28.50 m (93.5 ft)	274,838	Scrapped	Chantiers de l'Atlantique	Cie Nationale de Nav	
Seawise Giant	-	Supertanker	458.45 m (1,504.1 ft)	68.80 m (225.7 ft)	24.61 m (80.7 ft)	260,941	Scrapped	Sumitomo Heavy Industries	Orient Overseas Container Line	
Esso Atlantic	Esso Atlantic class	Supertanker	406.57 m (1,333.9 ft)	71.07 m (233.2 ft)	25.29 m (83.0 ft)	259,532	Scrapped	Hitachi Zosen Corporation	Esso Tankers Inc. Liberia	
Esso Pacific	Esso Atlantic class	Supertanker	406.57 m (1,333.9 ft)	71.07 m (233.2 ft)	25.29 m (83.0 ft)	247,160	Scrapped	Hitachi Zosen Corporation	Esso Tankers Inc.	
Icon of the Seas	Icon Class	Cruise ship	364.75 m (1,196.7 ft)	48.47 m (159.0 ft)	9.25 m (30.3 ft)	248,663	In service	Meyer Turku	Royal Caribbean Int.	
Sea World	-	Supertanker	364.0 m (1,194.2 ft)	79.03 m (259.3 ft)	24.03 m (78.8 ft)	245,100	Scrapped	Uddevallavarvet, Sweden	Addison Sg. & Tdg. S.A.	
Globtik Tokyo	Globtik Tokyo class	Supertanker	378.88 m (1,243.0 ft)	62.06 m (203.6 ft)	28.201 m (92.52 ft)	238,232	Scrapped	Ishikawajima Harima Heavy Industries	Tokyo Tanker	
Globtik London	Globtik Tokyo class	Supertanker	378.88 m (1,243.0 ft)	62.06 m (203.6 ft)	28.201 m (92.52 ft)	238,207	Scrapped	Ishikawajima Harima Heavy Industries	Tokyo Tanker	
FSO Asia	TI Class	Supertanker	379 m (1,243 ft)	68 m (223 ft)	24.525 m (80.46 ft)	236,638	In service as FSO	Daewoo Shipbuilding & Marine Engineering	Tankers International	
FSO Africa	TI Class	Supertanker	379 m (1,243 ft)	68 m (223 ft)	24.525 m (80.46 ft)	236,638	In service as FSO	Daewoo Shipbuilding & Marine Engineering	Tankers International	
CMA CGM Jacques Saadé	CMA CGM Jacques Saadé-class container ship	Container ship	399.9 m (1,312 ft)	61.3 m (201 ft)	16 m (52 ft)	236,583	In service	Shanghai Jiangnan Changxing Shipbuilding	CMA CGM	
CMA CGM Palais Royal	CMA CGM Jacques Saadé-class container ship	Container ship	399.9 m (1,312 ft)	61.3 m (201 ft)	16 m (52 ft)	236,583	In service	Shanghai Jiangnan Changxing Shipbuilding	CMA CGM	
CMA CGM Rivoli	CMA CGM Jacques Saadé-class container ship	Container ship	399.9 m (1,312 ft)	61.3 m (201 ft)	16 m (52 ft)	236,583	In service	Shanghai Jiangnan Changxing Shipbuilding	CMA CGM	
CMA CGM Concorde	CMA CGM Jacques Saadé-class container ship	Container ship	399.9 m (1,312 ft)	61.3 m (201 ft)	16 m (52 ft)	236,583	In service	Shanghai Jiangnan Changxing Shipbuilding	CMA CGM	
CMA CGM sorbonne	CMA CGM Jacques Saadé-class container ship	Container ship	399.9 m (1,312 ft)	61.3 m (201 ft)	16 m (52 ft)	236,583	In service	Shanghai Jiangnan Changxing Shipbuilding	CMA CGM	
CMA CGM Champs Élysée	CMA CGM Jacques Saadé-class container ship	Container ship	399.9 m (1,312 ft)	61.3 m (201 ft)	16 m (52 ft)	236,583	In service	Jiangnan Shipyard	CMA CGM	
CMA CGM Louvre	CMA CGM Jacques Saadé-class container ship	Container ship	399.9 m (1,312 ft)	61.3 m (201 ft)	16 m (52 ft)	236,583	In service	Jiangnan Shipyard	CMA CGM	
CMA CGM Montmartre	CMA CGM Jacques Saadé-class container ship	Container ship	399.9 m (1,312 ft)	61.3 m (201 ft)	16 m (52 ft)	236,583	In service	Jiangnan Shipyard	CMA CGM	
CMA CGM Trocadero	CMA CGM Jacques Saadé-class container ship	Container ship	399.9 m (1,312 ft)	61.3 m (201 ft)	16 m (52 ft)	236,583	In service	Jiangnan Shipyard	CMA CGM	
Ever Ace	Ever A-class container ship	Container ship	399.9 m (1,312 ft)	61.5 m (202 ft)	16.5 m (54 ft)	235,579	In service	Samsung Heavy Industries	Evergreen Marine	
Ever Act	Ever A-class container ship	Container ship	399.9 m (1,312 ft)	61.5 m (202 ft)	16.5 m (54 ft)	235,579	In service	Samsung Heavy Industries	Evergreen Marine	
Ever Aim	Ever A-class container ship	Container ship	399.9 m (1,312 ft)	61.5 m (202 ft)	16.5 m (54 ft)	235,579	In service	Samsung Heavy Industries	Evergreen Marine	
Ever Alp	Ever A-class container ship	Container ship	399.9 m (1,312 ft)	61.5 m (202 ft)	16.5 m (54 ft)	235,579	In service	Samsung Heavy Industries	Evergreen Marine	
OOCL Spain	OOCL G-class container ship	Container ship	399.9 m (1,312 ft)	61.3 m (201 ft)		235,341	In service	COSCO Shipyard Group	OOCL	
ONE Innovation	ONE I-class container ship	Container ship	399.9 m (1,312 ft)	61.4 m (201 ft)		235,311	In service	Japan Marine United Corporation	Ocean Network Express	
Nissei Maru	Globtik Tokyo class	Supertanker	378.85 m (1,242.9 ft)	62.06 m (203.6 ft)	28.2 m (93 ft)	234,287	Scrapped	Ishikawajima Harima Heavy Industries	Tokyo Tanker	
SA Europe	TI Class	Supertanker	379 m (1,243 ft)	68 m (223 ft)	24.525 m (80.46 ft)	234,006	In service as FSO	Daewoo Shipbuilding & Marine Engineering	Tankers International	
SA Oceania	TI Class	Supertanker	379 m (1,243 ft)	68 m (223 ft)	24.525 m (80.46 ft)	234,006	In service as FSO	Daewoo Shipbuilding & Marine Engineering	Tankers International	
MSC Gülsün	Gülsün-class container ship	Container ship	399.9 m (1,312 ft)	61.5 m (202 ft)	16.5 m (54 ft)	232,618	In service	Samsung Heavy Industries	Mediterranean Shipping Company	
MSC Samar	Gülsün-class container ship	Container ship	399.9 m (1,312 ft)	61.5 m (202 ft)	16.5 m (54 ft)	232,618	In service	Samsung Heavy Industries	Mediterranean Shipping Company	
MSC Leni	Gülsün-class container ship	Container ship	399.9 m (1,312 ft)	61.5 m (202 ft)	16.5 m (54 ft)	232,618	In service	Samsung Heavy Industries	Mediterranean Shipping Company	
MSC Mia	Gülsün-class container ship	Container ship	399.9 m (1,312 ft)	61.5 m (202 ft)	16.5 m (54 ft)	232,618	In service	Samsung Heavy Industries	Mediterranean Shipping Company	
MSC Febe	Gülsün-class container ship	Container ship	399.9 m (1,312 ft)	61.5 m (202 ft)	16.5 m (54 ft)	232,618	In service	Samsung Heavy Industries	Mediterranean Shipping Company	
MSC Ambra	Gülsün-class container ship	Container ship	399.9 m (1,312 ft)	61.5 m (202 ft)	16.5 m (54 ft)	232,618	In service	Samsung Heavy Industries	Mediterranean Shipping Company	
HMM Oslo	HMM Algeciras-class container ship	Container ship	399.9 m (1,312 ft)	61.5 m (202 ft)	16.53 m (54.2 ft)	232,311	In service	Samsung Heavy Industries	Hyundai Merchant Marine	
HMM Rotterdam	HMM Algeciras-class container ship	Container ship	399.9 m (1,312 ft)	61.5 m (202 ft)	16.53 m (54.2 ft)	232,311	In service	Samsung Heavy Industries	Hyundai Merchant Marine	
HMM Southampton	HMM Algeciras-class container ship	Container ship	399.9 m (1,312 ft)	61.5 m (202 ft)	16.53 m (54.2 ft)	232,311	In service	Samsung Heavy Industries	Hyundai Merchant Marine	
HMM Stockholm	HMM Algeciras-class container ship	Container ship	399.9 m (1,312 ft)	61.5 m (202 ft)	16.53 m (54.2 ft)	232,311	In service	Samsung Heavy Industries	Hyundai Merchant Marine	
HMM St Petersburg	HMM Algeciras-class container ship	Container ship	399.9 m (1,312 ft)	61.5 m (202 ft)	16.53 m (54.2 ft)	232,311	In service	Samsung Heavy Industries	Hyundai Merchant Marine	
MSC Apolline	Gülsün-class container ship	Container ship	399.8 m (1,312 ft)	61.0 m (200.1 ft)	16.5 m (54 ft)	228,786	In service	Daewoo Shipbuilding & Marine Engineering	Mediterranean Shipping Company	
MSC Amelia	Gülsün-class container ship	Container ship	399.8 m (1,312 ft)	61.0 m (200.1 ft)	16.5 m (54 ft)	228,786	In service	Daewoo Shipbuilding & Marine Engineering	Mediterranean Shipping Company	
MSC Diletta	Gülsün-class container ship	Container ship	399.8 m (1,312 ft)	61.0 m (200.1 ft)	16.5 m (54 ft)	228,786	In service	Daewoo Shipbuilding & Marine Engineering	Mediterranean Shipping Company	
MSC Michelle	Gülsün-class container ship	Container ship	399.8 m (1,312 ft)	61.0 m (200.1 ft)	16.5 m (54 ft)	228,786	In service	Daewoo Shipbuilding & Marine Engineering	Mediterranean Shipping Company	
MSC Allegra	Gülsün-class container ship	Container ship	399.8 m (1,312 ft)	61.0 m (200.1 ft)	16.5 m (54 ft)	228,786	In service	Daewoo Shipbuilding & Marine Engineering	Mediterranean Shipping Company	
MSC Mina	Gülsün-class container ship	Container ship	399.8 m (1,312 ft)	61.0 m (200.1 ft)	16.5 m (54 ft)	228,741	In service	Daewoo Shipbuilding & Marine Engineering	Mediterranean Shipping Company	
MSC Isabella	Gülsün-class container ship	Container ship	399.8 m (1,312 ft)	61.0 m (200.1 ft)	16.5 m (54 ft)	228,741	In service	Daewoo Shipbuilding & Marine Engineering	Mediterranean Shipping Company	
MSC Arina	Gülsün-class container ship	Container ship	399.8 m (1,312 ft)	61.0 m (200.1 ft)	16.5 m (54 ft)	228,741	In service	Daewoo Shipbuilding & Marine Engineering	Mediterranean Shipping Company	
MSC Nela	Gülsün-class container ship	Container ship	399.8 m (1,312 ft)	61.0 m (200.1 ft)	16.5 m (54 ft)	228,741	In service	Daewoo Shipbuilding & Marine Engineering	Mediterranean Shipping Company	
MSC Sixin	Gülsün-class container ship	Container ship	399.8 m (1,312 ft)	61.0 m (200.1 ft)	16.5 m (54 ft)	228,741	In service	Daewoo Shipbuilding & Marine Engineering	Mediterranean Shipping Company	
HMM Algeciras	HMM Algeciras-class container ship	Container ship	399.9 m (1,312 ft)	61.0 m (200.1 ft)	16.53 m (54.2 ft)	228,283	In service	Daewoo Shipbuilding & Marine Engineering	Hyundai Merchant Marine	
HMM Copenhagen	HMM Algeciras-class container ship	Container ship	399.9 m (1,312 ft)	61.0 m (200.1 ft)	16.53 m (54.2 ft)	228,283	In service	Daewoo Shipbuilding & Marine Engineering	Hyundai Merchant Marine	
HMM Dublin	HMM Algeciras-class container ship	Container ship	399.9 m (1,312 ft)	61.0 m (200.1 ft)	16.53 m (54.2 ft)	228,283	In service	Daewoo Shipbuilding & Marine Engineering	Hyundai Merchant Marine	
HMM Gdansk	HMM Algeciras-class container ship	Container ship	399.9 m (1,312 ft)	61.0 m (200.1 ft)	16.53 m (54.2 ft)	228,283	In service	Daewoo Shipbuilding & Marine Engineering	Hyundai Merchant Marine	
HMM Hamburg	HMM Algeciras-class container ship	Container ship	399.9 m (1,312 ft)	61.0 m (200.1 ft)	16.53 m (54.2 ft)	228,283	In service	Daewoo Shipbuilding & Marine Engineering	Hyundai Merchant Marine	
HMM Helsinki	HMM Algeciras-class container ship	Container ship	399.9 m (1,312 ft)	61.0 m (200.1 ft)	16.53 m (54.2 ft)	228,283	In service	Daewoo Shipbuilding & Marine Engineering	Hyundai Merchant Marine	
HMM Le Havre	HMM Algeciras-class container ship	Container ship	399.9 m (1,312 ft)	61.0 m (200.1 ft)	16.53 m (54.2 ft)	228,283	In service	Daewoo Shipbuilding & Marine Engineering	Hyundai Merchant Marine	
Symphony of the Seas	Oasis Class	Cruise ship	361.011 m (1,184.42 ft)	47.448 m (155.67 ft)	9.322 m (30.58 ft)	228,081	In service	STX France SA	Royal Caribbean International	
Harmony of the Seas	Oasis Class	Cruise ship	362.1 m (1,188 ft)	47 m (154 ft)	9 m (30 ft)	226,963	In service	STX France SA	Royal Caribbean International	
Oasis of the Seas	Oasis Class	Cruise ship	360 m (1,180 ft)	47 m (154 ft)	9 m (30 ft)	226,838	In service	STX Turku Shipyard	Royal Caribbean International	
Allure of the Seas	Oasis Class	Cruise ship	360 m (1,180 ft)	47 m (154 ft)	9 m (30 ft)	225,282	In service	STX Turku Shipyard	Royal Caribbean International	
Wonder of the Seas	Oasis Class	Cruise ship	362.04 m (1,187 ft 10 in)	47 m (154 ft)	9 m (30 ft)	236,857	In service	Chantiers de l'Atlantique	Royal Caribbean International	
Ever Glory	Ever G-class container ship	Container ship	400 m (1,300 ft)	58.8 m (193 ft)	16 m (52 ft)	219,775	In service	Imabari Shipbuilding Saijo	Evergreen Marine	
Ever Globe	Ever G-class container ship	Container ship	400 m (1,300 ft)	58.8 m (193 ft)	16 m (52 ft)	219,775	In service	Imabari Shipbuilding Saijo	Evergreen Marine	
Ever Govern	Ever G-class container ship	Container ship	400 m (1,300 ft)	58.8 m (193 ft)	16 m (52 ft)	219,688	In service	Imabari Shipbuilding Marugame	Evergreen Marine	
Ever Greet	Ever G-class container ship	Container ship	400 m (1,300 ft)	58.8 m (193 ft)	16 m (52 ft)	219,688	In service	Imabari Shipbuilding Marugame	Evergreen Marine	
Ever Genius	Ever G-class container ship	Container ship	400 m (1,300 ft)	58.8 m (193 ft)	16 m (52 ft)	219,400	In service	Imabari Shipbuilding Saijo	Evergreen Marine	
Ever Gifted	Ever G-class container ship	Container ship	400 m (1,300 ft)	58.8 m (193 ft)	16 m (52 ft)	219,352	In service	Imabari Shipbuilding Saijo	Evergreen Marine	
CMA CGM Antoine de Saint Exupery	CMA CGM Antoine de Saint Exupery-class container ship	Container ship	399.9 m (1,312 ft)	59 m (194 ft)	16 m (52 ft)	219,277	In service	Hanjin Heavy Industries and Construction Philippines	CMA CGM	
CMA CGM Jean Mermoz	CMA CGM Antoine de Saint Exupery-class container ship	Container ship	399.9 m (1,312 ft)	59 m (194 ft)	16 m (52 ft)	219,277	In service	Hanjin Heavy Industries and Construction Philippines	CMA CGM	
CMA CGM Louis Bleriot	CMA CGM Antoine de Saint Exupery-class container ship	Container ship	399.9 m (1,312 ft)	59 m (194 ft)	16 m (52 ft)	219,277	In service	Hanjin Heavy Industries and Construction Philippines	CMA CGM	
Ever Grade	Ever G-class container ship	Container ship	400 m (1,300 ft)	58.8 m (193 ft)	16 m (52 ft)	219,158	In service	Imabari Shipbuilding Marugame	Evergreen Marine	
Ever Golden	Ever G-class container ship	Container ship	400 m (1,300 ft)	58.8 m (193 ft)	16 m (52 ft)	219,079	In service	Imabari Shipbuilding Saijo	Evergreen Marine	
Ever Goods	Ever G-class container ship	Container ship	400 m (1,300 ft)	58.8 m (193 ft)	16 m (52 ft)	219,079	In service	Imabari Shipbuilding Marugame	Evergreen Marine	
Ever Given	Ever G-class container ship	Container ship	400 m (1,300 ft)	58.8 m (193 ft)	16 m (52 ft)	219,079	In service	Imabari Shipbuilding Marugame	Evergreen Marine	
Andros Petros	Andros Petros class	Supertanker	378.39 m (1,241.4 ft)	68.08 m (223.4 ft)	25.04 m (82.2 ft)	218,447	Scrapped	Ishikawajima Harima Heavy Industries	Northern Sealanes Corp	
Esso Mediterranean	Andros Petros class	Supertanker	378.39 m (1,241.4 ft)	68.08 m (223.4 ft)	25.51 m (83.7 ft)	218,447	Scrapped	Ishikawajima Harima Heavy Industries	Esso Tankers Inc	
Ever Gentle	Ever G-class container ship	Container ship	400 m (1,300 ft)	58.8 m (193 ft)	16 m (52 ft)	217,612	In service	Imabari Shipbuilding Marugame	Evergreen Marine	
MSC World Europa	World class	Cruise ship	333.3 m (1,094 ft)	47.0 m (154.2 ft)	9.2 m (30 ft)	215,863	In service	Saint-Nazaire, France	MSC Cruises	
COSCO Shipping Universe	COSCO Universe class	Container ship	400 m (1,300 ft)	58.6 m (192 ft)	16 m (52 ft)	215,553	In service	Jiangnan Shipyard	COSCO	
COSCO Shipping Nebula	COSCO Universe class	Container ship	400 m (1,300 ft)	58.6 m (192 ft)	16 m (52 ft)	215,553	In service	Jiangnan Shipyard	COSCO	
COSCO Shipping Galaxy	COSCO Universe class	Container ship	400 m (1,300 ft)	58.6 m (192 ft)	16 m (52 ft)	215,553	In service	Jiangnan Shipyard	COSCO	
COSCO Shipping Solar	COSCO Universe class	Container ship	400 m (1,300 ft)	58.6 m (192 ft)	16 m (52 ft)	215,553	In service	Jiangnan Shipyard	COSCO	
COSCO Shipping Star	COSCO Universe class	Container ship	400 m (1,300 ft)	58.6 m (192 ft)	16 m (52 ft)	215,553	In service	Jiangnan Shipyard	COSCO	
COSCO Shipping Planet	COSCO Universe class	Container ship	400 m (1,300 ft)	58.6 m (192 ft)	16 m (52 ft)	215,553	In service	Jiangnan Shipyard	COSCO	
Madrid Maersk	Second Generation Triple E Class	Container ship	399 m (1,309 ft)	58.6 m (192 ft)	16 m (52 ft)	214,286	In service	Daewoo Shipbuilding and Marine Engineering	Maersk	
Munich Maersk	Second Generation Triple E Class	Container ship	399 m (1,309 ft)	58.6 m (192 ft)	16 m (52 ft)	214,286	In service	Daewoo Shipbuilding and Marine Engineering	Maersk	
Moscow Maersk	Second Generation Triple E Class	Container ship	399 m (1,309 ft)	58.6 m (192 ft)	16 m (52 ft)	214,286	In service	Daewoo Shipbuilding and Marine Engineering	Maersk	
Milan Maersk	Second Generation Triple E Class	Container ship	399 m (1,309 ft)	58.6 m (192 ft)	16 m (52 ft)	214,286	In service	Daewoo Shipbuilding and Marine Engineering	Maersk	
Monaco Maersk	Second Generation Triple E Class	Container ship	399 m (1,309 ft)	58.6 m (192 ft)	16 m (52 ft)	214,286	In service	Daewoo Shipbuilding and Marine Engineering	Maersk	
Marseille Maersk	Second Generation Triple E Class	Container ship	399 m (1,309 ft)	58.6 m (192 ft)	16 m (52 ft)	214,286	In service	Daewoo Shipbuilding and Marine Engineering	Maersk	
Manchester Maersk	Second Generation Triple E Class	Container ship	399 m (1,309 ft)	58.6 m (192 ft)	16 m (52 ft)	214,286	In service	Daewoo Shipbuilding and Marine Engineering	Maersk	
Murcia Maersk	Second Generation Triple E Class	Container ship	399 m (1,309 ft)	58.6 m (192 ft)	16 m (52 ft)	214,286	In service	Daewoo Shipbuilding and Marine Engineering	Maersk	
Manila Maersk	Second Generation Triple E Class	Container ship	399 m (1,309 ft)	58.6 m (192 ft)	16 m (52 ft)	214,286	In service	Daewoo Shipbuilding and Marine Engineering	Maersk	
Mumbai Maersk	Second Generation Triple E Class	Container ship	399 m (1,309 ft)	58.6 m (192 ft)	16 m (52 ft)	214,286	In service	Daewoo Shipbuilding and Marine Engineering	Maersk	
Maastricht Maersk	Second Generation Triple E Class	Container ship	399 m (1,309 ft)	58.6 m (192 ft)	16 m (52 ft)	214,286	In service	Daewoo Shipbuilding and Marine Engineering	Maersk	
Berge Empress	Berge Emperor class	Supertanker	381.82 m (1,252.7 ft)	68.08 m (223.4 ft)	22.78 m (74.7 ft)	211,359	Scrapped	Mitsui Engineering & Shipbuilding	Bergesen d.y.	
OOCL Hong Kong	OOCL G Class	Container ship	399.87 m (1,311.9 ft)	58.8 m (193 ft)	16 m (52 ft)	210,890	In service	Samsung Heavy Industries	Orient Overseas Container Line	
OOCL Germany	OOCL G Class	Container ship	399.87 m (1,311.9 ft)	58.8 m (193 ft)	16 m (52 ft)	210,890	In service	Samsung Heavy Industries	Orient Overseas Container Line	
OOCL Japan	OOCL G Class	Container ship	399.87 m (1,311.9 ft)	58.8 m (193 ft)	16 m (52 ft)	210,890	In service	Samsung Heavy Industries	Orient Overseas Container Line	
OOCL United Kingdom	OOCL G Class	Container ship	399.87 m (1,311.9 ft)	58.8 m (193 ft)	16 m (52 ft)	210,890	In service	Samsung Heavy Industries	Orient Overseas Container Line	
OOCL Scandinavia	OOCL G Class	Container ship	399.87 m (1,311.9 ft)	58.8 m (193 ft)	16 m (52 ft)	210,890	In service	Samsung Heavy Industries	Orient Overseas Container Line	
OOCL Indonesia	OOCL G Class	Container ship	399.87 m (1,311.9 ft)	58.8 m (193 ft)	16 m (52 ft)	210,890	In service	Samsung Heavy Industries	Orient Overseas Container Line	
MOL Truth	MOL Triumph-class container ship	Container ship	399 m (1,309 ft)	58.0 m (190.3 ft)	16 m (52 ft)	210,691	In service	Imabari Shipbuilding Saijo	Ocean Network Express	
MOL Treasure	MOL Triumph-class container ship	Container ship	399 m (1,309 ft)	58.0 m (190.3 ft)	16 m (52 ft)	210,691	In service	Imabari Shipbuilding Marugame	Ocean Network Express	
MOL Triumph	MOL Triumph-class container ship	Container ship	400 m (1,300 ft)	58.8 m (193 ft)	16 m (52 ft)	210,678	In service	Samsung Heavy Industries	Ocean Network Express	
MOL Trust	MOL Triumph-class container ship	Container ship	400 m (1,300 ft)	58.8 m (193 ft)	16 m (52 ft)	210,678	In service	Samsung Heavy Industries	Ocean Network Express	
MOL Tribute	MOL Triumph-class container ship	Container ship	400 m (1,300 ft)	58.8 m (193 ft)	16 m (52 ft)	210,678	In service	Samsung Heavy Industries	Ocean Network Express	
MOL Tradition	MOL Triumph-class container ship	Container ship	400 m (1,300 ft)	58.8 m (193 ft)	16 m (52 ft)	210,678	In service	Samsung Heavy Industries	Ocean Network Express	
Al Rekkah	Aiko Maru class	Supertanker	365.99 m (1,200.8 ft)	70.06 m (229.9 ft)	22.6 m (74 ft)	210,068	Scrapped	Mitsubishi Heavy Industries	Kuwait Oil Tanker Co S.A.K.	
Aiko Maru	Aiko Maru class	Supertanker	365.99 m (1,200.8 ft)	70.06 m (229.9 ft)	22.9 m (75 ft)	209,788	Scrapped	Mitsubishi Heavy Industries	Sanko Line	
Jinko Maru	Aiko Maru class	Supertanker	365.99 m (1,200.8 ft)	70.06 m (229.9 ft)	22.9 m (75 ft)	209,787	Scrapped	Mitsubishi Heavy Industries	Sanko Line	
Coraggio	Hilda Knudsen class	Supertanker	378.04 m (1,240.3 ft)	69.07 m (226.6 ft)	22.99 m (75.4 ft)	205,960	Scrapped	Kawasaki Heavy Industries	Pluto S.p.A. Di Navigazione	
Hilda Knudsen	Hilda Knudsen class	Supertanker	378.04 m (1,240.3 ft)	69.04 m (226.5 ft)	22.99 m (75.4 ft)	203,966	Scrapped	Kawasaki Heavy Industries	Knut Knutsen O.A.S.	
Esso Deutschland	Hilda Knudsen class	Supertanker	378.04 m (1,240.3 ft)	69.07 m (226.6 ft)	22.92 m (75.2 ft)	203,869	Scrapped	Kawasaki Heavy Industries	Esso A.G.	
Yuan He Hai	Valemax class	Ore Carrier	361.9 m (1,187 ft)	65 m (213 ft)	23 m (75 ft)	203,403	In service	Shanghai Waigaoqiao Shipbuilding	China COSCO Bulk Shipping	
Yuan Gu Hai	Valemax class	Ore Carrier	361.9 m (1,187 ft)	65 m (213 ft)	23 m (75 ft)	203,403	In service	Shanghai Waigaoqiao Shipbuilding	China COSCO Bulk Shipping	
Yuan Yi Hai	Valemax class	Ore Carrier	361.8 m (1,187 ft)	65 m (213 ft)	23 m (75 ft)	203,403	In service	Shanghai Waigaoqiao Shipbuilding	China COSCO Bulk Shipping	
Yuan Bao Hai	Valemax class	Ore Carrier	361.8 m (1,187 ft)	65 m (213 ft)	23 m (75 ft)	203,403	In service	Shanghai Waigaoqiao Shipbuilding	China COSCO Bulk Shipping	
Pacific Unity	Valemax class	Ore Carrier	361.8 m (1,187 ft)	65 m (213 ft)	23.036 m (75.58 ft)	203,396	In service	Shanghai Waigaoqiao Shipbuilding	China Merchants Energy Shipping	
Pacific Harvest	Valemax class	Ore Carrier	361.8 m (1,187 ft)	65 m (213 ft)	23.036 m (75.58 ft)	203,396	In service	Shanghai Waigaoqiao Shipbuilding	China Merchants Energy Shipping	
Pacific Vision	Valemax class	Ore Carrier	361.8 m (1,187 ft)	65 m (213 ft)	23.036 m (75.58 ft)	203,396	In service	Shanghai Waigaoqiao Shipbuilding	China Merchants Energy Shipping	
Pacific Excellence	Valemax class	Ore Carrier	361.8 m (1,187 ft)	65 m (213 ft)	23.036 m (75.58 ft)	203,396	In service	Shanghai Waigaoqiao Shipbuilding	China Merchants Energy Shipping	
Pacific Prosperity	Valemax class	Ore Carrier	361.9 m (1,187 ft)	65 m (213 ft)	23 m (75 ft)	203,389	In service	China Merchants Heavy Industry Jiangsu	China Merchants Energy Shipping	
Pacific Auspice	Valemax class	Ore Carrier	361.9 m (1,187 ft)	65 m (213 ft)	23 m (75 ft)	203,389	In service	China Merchants Heavy Industry Jiangsu	China Merchants Energy Shipping	
Yuan Hua Hai	Valemax class	Ore Carrier	362 m (1,188 ft)	65 m (213 ft)	23 m (75 ft)	203,353	In service	Shanghai Waigaoqiao Shipbuilding	China Merchants Energy Shipping	
Ore Ningbo	Valemax class	Ore Carrier	361.9 m (1,187 ft)	65 m (213 ft)	23.036 m (75.58 ft)	203,347	In service	Jiangsu Yangzi Xinfu Shipbuilding	China Merchants Energy Shipping	
Ore Tianjin	Valemax class	Ore Carrier	361.9 m (1,187 ft)	65 m (213 ft)	23.036 m (75.58 ft)	203,339	In service	Qingdao Beihai Shipbuilding	China Merchants Energy Shipping	
Ore Dalian	Valemax class	Ore Carrier	361.9 m (1,187 ft)	65 m (213 ft)	23.036 m (75.58 ft)	203,339	In service	Qingdao Beihai Shipbuilding	China Merchants Energy Shipping	
Ore Xiamen	Valemax class	Ore Carrier	361.9 m (1,187 ft)	65 m (213 ft)	23.036 m (75.58 ft)	203,339	In service	Qingdao Beihai Shipbuilding	China Merchants Energy Shipping	
Ore Zhangjian	Valemax class	Ore Carrier	361.9 m (1,187 ft)	65 m (213 ft)	23.036 m (75.58 ft)	203,339	In service	Qingdao Beihai Shipbuilding	China Merchants Energy Shipping	
Ore Tangshan	Valemax class	Ore Carrier	361.9 m (1,187 ft)	65 m (213 ft)	23.036 m (75.58 ft)	203,326	In service	Jiangsu Yangzi Xinfu Shipbuilding	China Merchants Energy Shipping	
Ore Shanghai	Valemax class	Ore Carrier	361.9 m (1,187 ft)	65 m (213 ft)	23.036 m (75.58 ft)	203,326	In service	Jiangsu Yangzi Xinfu Shipbuilding	China Merchants Energy Shipping	
Ore Hong Kong	Valemax class	Ore Carrier	361.9 m (1,187 ft)	65 m (213 ft)	23.036 m (75.58 ft)	203,326	In service	Jiangsu Yangzi Xinfu Shipbuilding	China Merchants Energy Shipping	
Ore Shenzen	Valemax class	Ore Carrier	361.9 m (1,187 ft)	65 m (213 ft)	23.036 m (75.58 ft)	203,326	In service	Jiangsu Yangzi Xinfu Shipbuilding	China Merchants Energy Shipping	
Ore Guangzhou	Valemax class	Ore Carrier	361.9 m (1,187 ft)	65 m (213 ft)	23.036 m (75.58 ft)	203,326	In service	Jiangsu Yangzi Xinfu Shipbuilding	China Merchants Energy Shipping	
Yuan Jin Hai	Valemax class	Ore Carrier	361.8 m (1,187 ft)	65 m (213 ft)	23 m (75 ft)	203,322	In service	Shanghai Waigaoqiao Shipbuilding	China COSCO Bulk Shipping	
Yuan Shen Hai	Valemax class	Ore Carrier	361.8 m (1,187 ft)	65 m (213 ft)	23 m (75 ft)	203,322	In service	Shanghai Waigaoqiao Shipbuilding	China COSCO Bulk Shipping	
Yuan Fu Hai	Valemax class	Ore Carrier	361.8 m (1,187 ft)	65 m (213 ft)	23 m (75 ft)	203,322	In service	Shanghai Waigaoqiao Shipbuilding	China COSCO Bulk Shipping	
Pacific Express	Valemax class	Ore Carrier	361.8 m (1,187 ft)	65 m (213 ft)	23 m (75 ft)	203,322	In service	Qingdao Beihai Shipbuilding	China Merchants Energy Shipping	
Pacific Flourish	Valemax class	Ore Carrier	361.8 m (1,187 ft)	65 m (213 ft)	23 m (75 ft)	203,322	In service	Qingdao Beihai Shipbuilding	China Merchants Energy Shipping	
Pacific Career	Valemax class	Ore Carrier	361.8 m (1,187 ft)	65 m (213 ft)	23 m (75 ft)	203,322	In service	Qingdao Beihai Shipbuilding	China Merchants Energy Shipping	
Pacific Longevity	Valemax class	Ore Carrier	361.8 m (1,187 ft)	65 m (213 ft)	23 m (75 ft)	203,322	In service	Qingdao Beihai Shipbuilding	China Merchants Energy Shipping	
Berge Emperor	Berge Emperor class	Supertanker	381.82 m (1,252.7 ft)	68.08 m (223.4 ft)	22.878 m (75.06 ft)	203,110	Scrapped	Mitsui Engineering & Shipbuilding	Bergesen d.y.	
Ore China	Valemax class	Ore Carrier	360 m (1,180 ft)	65 m (213 ft)	23.024 m (75.54 ft)	201,384	In service	Jiangsu Rongsheng Heavy Industries	China Merchants Energy Shipping	
Ore Dongjiakou	Valemax class	Ore Carrier	360 m (1,180 ft)	65 m (213 ft)	23.024 m (75.54 ft)	201,384	In service	Jiangsu Rongsheng Heavy Industries	China Merchants Energy Shipping	
Pacific Warrior	Valemax class	Ore Carrier	360 m (1,180 ft)	65 m (213 ft)	23.024 m (75.54 ft)	201,384	In service	Jiangsu Rongsheng Heavy Industries	China Merchants Energy Shipping	
Ore Hebei	Valemax class	Ore Carrier	360 m (1,180 ft)	65 m (213 ft)	23.024 m (75.54 ft)	201,384	In service	Jiangsu Rongsheng Heavy Industries	China Merchants Energy Shipping	
Ore Shandong	Valemax class	Ore Carrier	360 m (1,180 ft)	65 m (213 ft)	23.024 m (75.54 ft)	201,384	In service	Jiangsu Rongsheng Heavy Industries	China Merchants Energy Shipping	
Yuan Zhen Hai	Valemax class	Ore Carrier	360 m (1,180 ft)	65 m (213 ft)	23.024 m (75.54 ft)	201,384	In service	Jiangsu Rongsheng Heavy Industries	China COSCO Bulk Shipping	
Yuan Shi Hai	Valemax class	Ore Carrier	360 m (1,180 ft)	65 m (213 ft)	23.024 m (75.54 ft)	201,384	In service	Jiangsu Rongsheng Heavy Industries	China COSCO Bulk Shipping	
Yuan Jian Hai	Valemax class	Ore Carrier	360 m (1,180 ft)	65 m (213 ft)	23.024 m (75.54 ft)	201,384	In service	Jiangsu Rongsheng Heavy Industries	China COSCO Bulk Shipping	
Yuan Zhuo Hai	Valemax class	Ore Carrier	360 m (1,180 ft)	65 m (213 ft)	23.024 m (75.54 ft)	201,384	In service	Jiangsu Rongsheng Heavy Industries	China COSCO Bulk Shipping	
Pacific Merchants	Valemax class	Ore Carrier	360 m (1,180 ft)	65 m (213 ft)	23.024 m (75.54 ft)	201,384	In service	Jiangsu Rongsheng Heavy Industries	China Merchants Energy Shipping	
Pacific Winner	Valemax class	Ore Carrier	360 m (1,180 ft)	65 m (213 ft)	23.024 m (75.54 ft)	201,384	In service	Jiangsu Rongsheng Heavy Industries	China Merchants Energy Shipping	
Pacific Mariner	Valemax class	Ore Carrier	360 m (1,180 ft)	65 m (213 ft)	23.024 m (75.54 ft)	201,384	In service	Jiangsu Rongsheng Heavy Industries	China Merchants Energy Shipping	
Sohar Max	Valemax class	Ore Carrier	360 m (1,180 ft)	65 m (213 ft)	23.024 m (75.54 ft)	201,384	In service	Jiangsu Rongsheng Heavy Industries	Oman Shipping Company	
Liwa Max	Valemax class	Ore Carrier	360 m (1,180 ft)	65 m (213 ft)	23.024 m (75.54 ft)	201,384	In service	Jiangsu Rongsheng Heavy Industries	Oman Shipping Company	
Shinas Max	Valemax class	Ore Carrier	360 m (1,180 ft)	65 m (213 ft)	23.024 m (75.54 ft)	201,384	In service	Jiangsu Rongsheng Heavy Industries	Oman Shipping Company	
Saham Max	Valemax class	Ore Carrier	360 m (1,180 ft)	65 m (213 ft)	23.024 m (75.54 ft)	201,384	In service	Jiangsu Rongsheng Heavy Industries	Oman Shipping Company	

== See also ==
- List of largest cruise ships
- List of largest container ships
