= Argentina-class container ship =

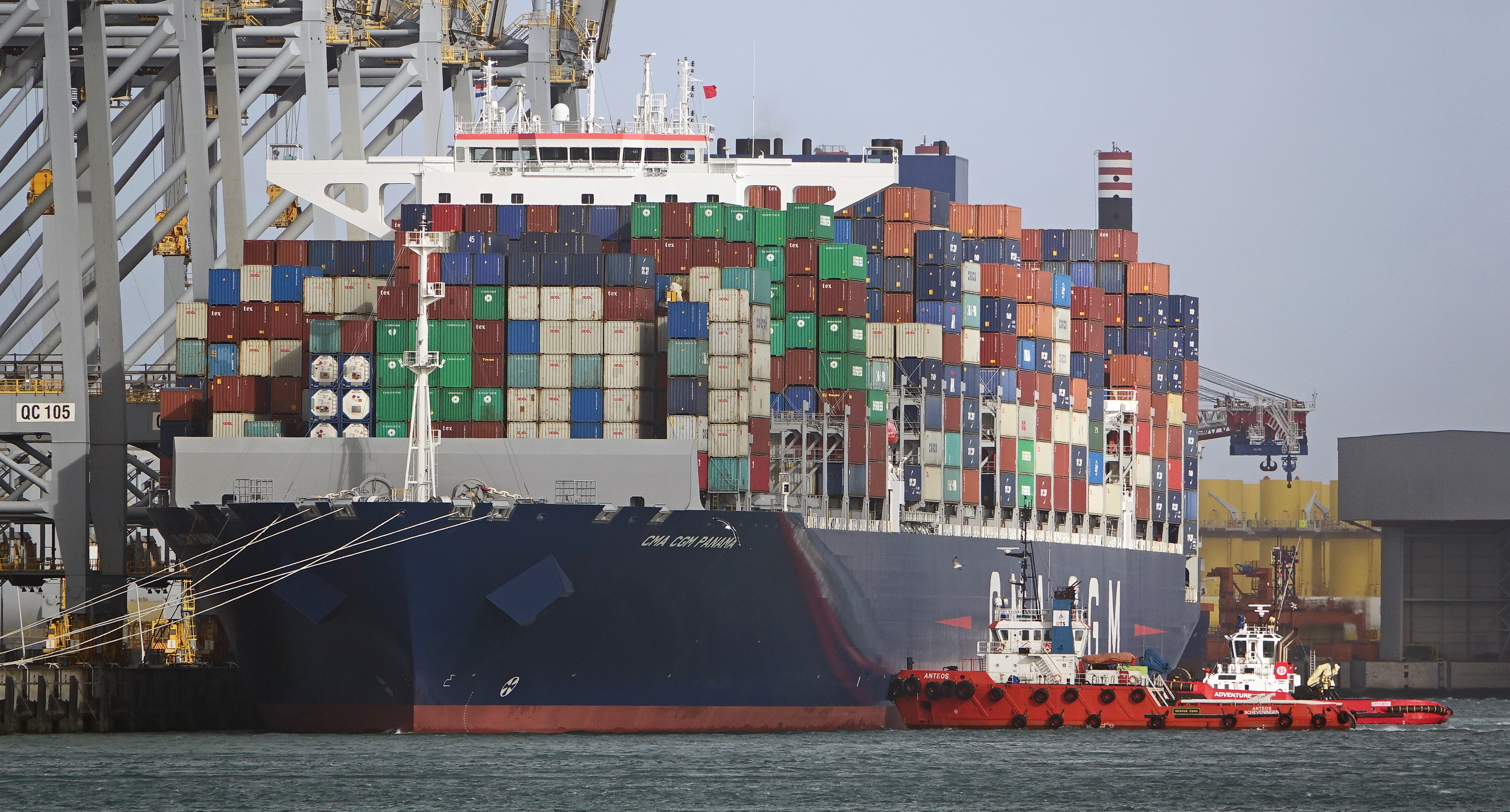
- CMA CGM Panama in the port of Rotterdam

Class overview
- Builders: Hyundai Samho Heavy Industries; Hyundai Heavy Industries
- Operators: CMA CGM
- In service: 2019–present
- Planned: 22
- Completed: 17
- Active: 17

General characteristics
- Type: Container ship
- Tonnage: 149,314 GT
- Length: 366 m (1,201 ft)
- Beam: 51 m (167 ft)
- Draft: 16 m (52 ft)
- Propulsion: MAN B&W 11G90ME-C
- Capacity: 15,052 TEU

General characteristics (LNG DF)
- Type: Container ship
- Tonnage: 150,844 GT
- Length: 366 m (1,201 ft)
- Beam: 51 m (167 ft)
- Draft: 16 m (52 ft)
- Propulsion: MAN B&W 11G90ME-GI
- Capacity: 14,812 TEU

The Argentina class is a series of 22 container ships built for Eastern Pacific Shipping and operated by CMA CGM. The ships have a maximum theoretical capacity of 15,052 TEU. The ships were built by Hyundai Samho Heavy Industries. The first five ships are powered by conventional engines and are equipped with scrubbers. The remaining ships will be powered by LNG instead.

== List of ships ==
Ship	Yard number	IMO number	Delivery	Status	ref
Hyundai Samho Heavy Industries
CMA CGM Argentina	S985	9839909	1 July 2019	In service	
CMA CGM Mexico	S986	9839911	19 July 2019	In service	
CMA CGM Panama	S987	9839923	24 September 2019	In service	
CMA CGM Chile	S988	9839935	20 December 2019	In service	
CMA CGM Brazil	S989	9860245	22 May 2020	In service	
Hyundai Samho Heavy Industries (LNG dual-fuel)
CMA CGM Tenere	S990	9859117	15 September 2020	In service	
CMA CGM Scandola	S991	9859129	28 December 2020	In service	
CMA CGM Iguacu	S992	9859131	26 April 2021	In service	
CMA CGM Bali	S993	9867827	15 September 2021	In service	
CMA CGM Symi	S994	9867839	11 March 2022	In service	
CMA CGM Arctic	S995	9867841	26 May 2022	In service	
Hyundai Heavy Industries (LNG dual-fuel)
CMA CGM Hope	3162	9897755	29 October 2021	In service	
CMA CGM Unity	3163	9897767	15 December 2021	In service	
CMA CGM Dignity	3164	9897779	10 February 2022	In service	
CMA CGM Integrity	3165	9897781	22 February 2022	In service	
CMA CGM Liberty	3166	9897793	20 March 2022	In service	
CMA CGM Pride	3178	9924429	5 November 2022	In service	
Source: new-ships

== See also ==
- CMA CGM Jacques Saadé-class container ship
- CMA CGM Antoine de Saint Exupery-class container ship
- Explorer-class container ship
- CMA CGM A. Lincoln-class container ship
