= Largest ships =

Largest ships or biggest ships may refer to:

- List of longest ships
- List of largest ships by gross tonnage
