= CCNI Arauco =

The CCNI Arauco is a large container ship that experienced a major fire in the Port of Hamburg on September 1, 2016. The vessel was only a year old, having been built in the Philippines, in 2015, at the Hanjin Subic Shipyard.

It took four days to extinguish the fire. Authorities took the risk of flooding her holds, and breaking her back, due to thermal shock, when local fireboats couldn't extinguish the fire.

== Specifications ==
Specifications
feature	value
length	300 metres (980 ft)
beam	49 metres (161 ft)
draft	11.9 metres (39 ft)
deadweight tonnage	112,588 tonnes
gross tonnage	95,138 tonnes
container capacity	9000 Twenty-foot equivalent unit containers
