= Agila Subic Shipyard =

Shipyard in the Philippines

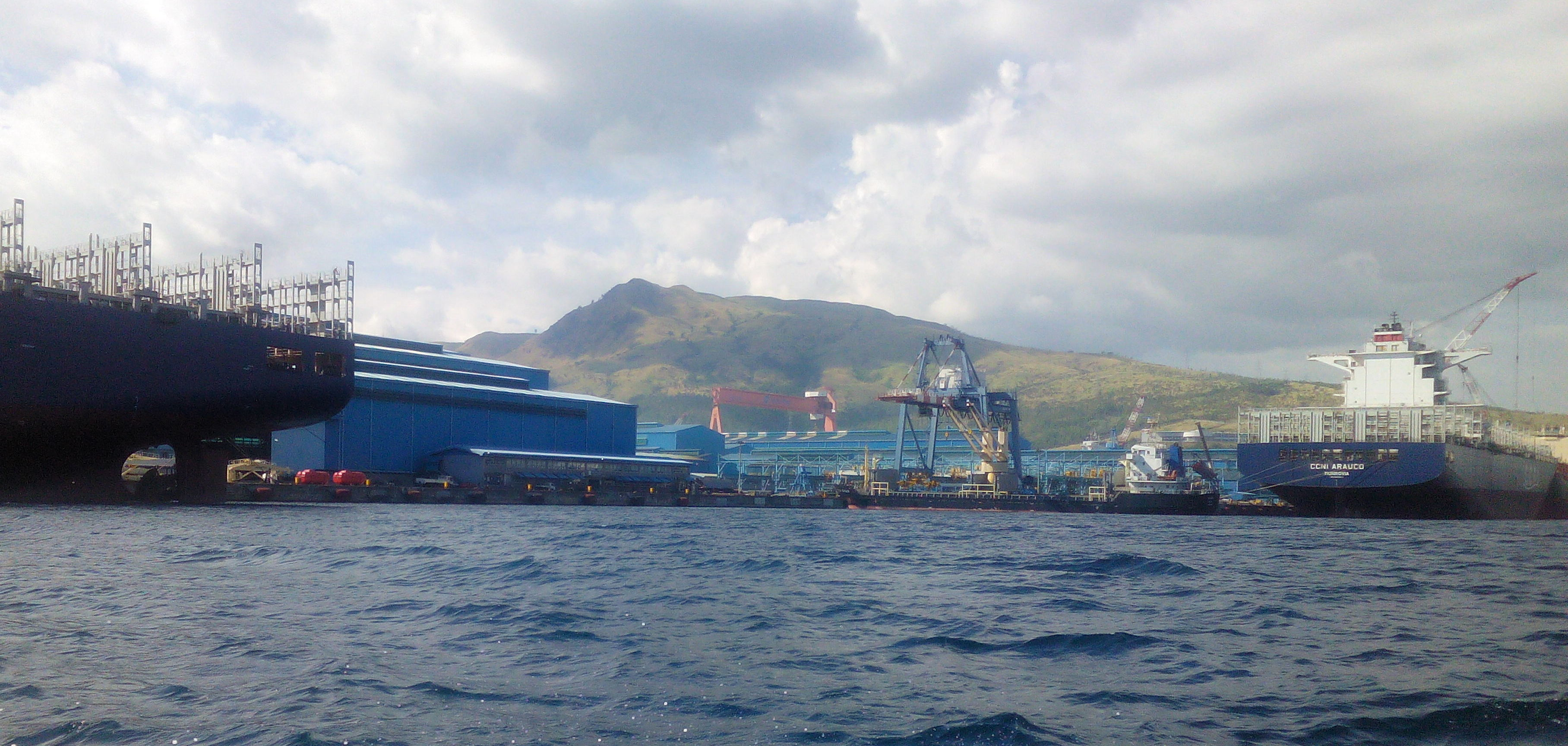
- Interactive map of Agila Subic Shipyard

Location
- Country: Philippines
- Location: Subic Freeport Zone, Subic, Zambales
- Coordinates: 14°49′01.4″N 120°12′20.2″E

Details
- Opened: 2006
- Operated by: 2006–2019: Hanjin Heavy Industries and Construction Philippines; 2022–present: Agila Subic; Vectrus; Philippine Navy
- Owned by: 2006–2019: Hanjin Heavy Industries and Construction Philippines; 2022–present: Cerberus Capital Management

Statistics
- Website www.agilasubic.com

Agila Subic Multi-Use Facilities (also known as Agila Subic Shipyard; formerly the Hanjin Subic Shipyard) are a shipyard in Subic, Zambales, Philippines. It is located along the coastline of the Redondo Peninsula in Sitio Agusuhin.

It was formerly owned and operated by shipbuilding firm Hanjin Heavy Industries and Construction Philippines. In 2022, Cerberus Capital Management purchased the Subic port.

== History ==
=== As Hanjin Subic Shipyard ===
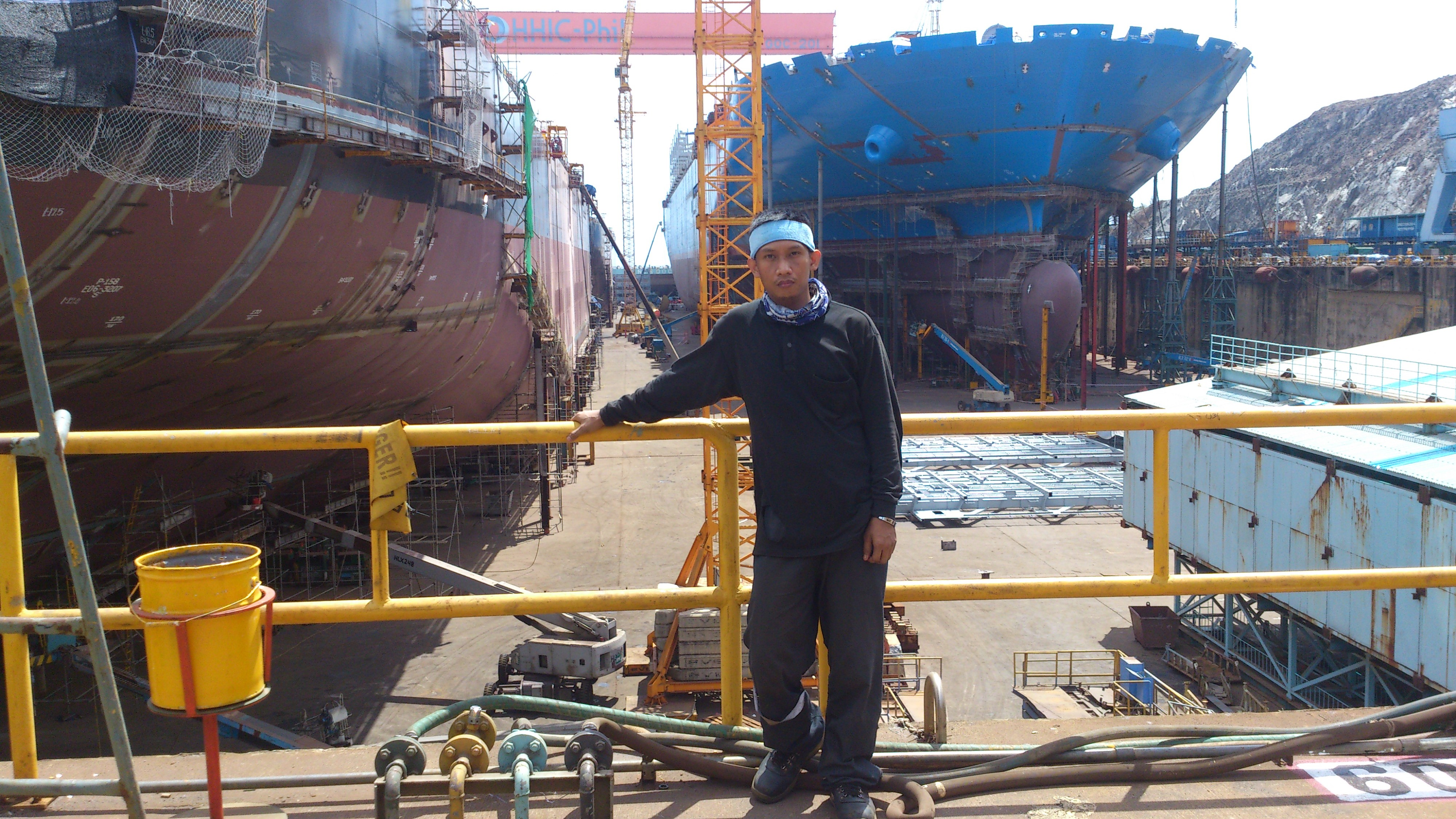
A 20.766 TEU container ship (CMA CGM Louis Bleriot) and oil tanker (Levantine Sea) being constructed at Dry Dock no. 6

The Subic Shipyard was built by Hanjin Heavy Industries and Construction Philippines (HHIC–Phil), a subsidiary of the South Korean firm Hanjin Heavy Industries. HHIC–Phil received its first order to build a ship at the Subic Shipyard in 2006. Construction of the shipyard began in early 2006 and its facilities were complete by 2009. The first ship built at the Subic Freeport Zone, the MV Argolikos, was inaugurated at the Hanji Subic Shipyard in July 2008, in a ceremony attended by then President Gloria Macapagal Arroyo. The ship was also the Philippine-made container ship.

By 2015, the Hanjin Subic Shipyard became one of the top ten top 10 shipbuilders in the world in terms of orderbook. At one point, the Philippines is the fifth largest shipbuilding nation in the world, largely owing to the output of the Subic shipyard. At its peak in 2016, the shipyard employed 35,000 people.

Riddled with debt, HHIC–Phil filed for voluntary rehabilitation under Republic Act 10142, otherwise known as "An Act Providing for the Rehabilitation or Liquidation of Financially Distressed Enterprises and Individuals" on January 8, 2019 and laid off 10,000 of its employees retaining only 300 employees in the shipyard by January 2020.

=== Agila Subic ===
Australian shipbuilder Austal and US-based private equity firm Cerberus Capital Management considered launching a joint bid to take over the Subic shipyard. Austal would later drop its bid to have a stake in the shipyard.

Agila Subic became Cerberus' new partner, taking over the operations of the shipyard in March 2022. Agila Subic is a Dutch venture consisting of four companies that are affiliates of Cerberus. Accordingly the shipyard was renamed as the Agila Subic Multi-Use Facilities.

The Philippine Navy began leasing the shipyard's northern section in May 2022. American defense contractor Vectrus also moved in.

Cerberus completed its acquisition of the shipyard by April 2022. In November 2022, Subic Bay Metropolitan Authority officials welcomed United States Ambassador to the Philippines MaryKay Carlson and indicated they wanted to see American military forces return to the Philippine naval base.

South Korean shipbuilding firm Hyundai Heavy Industries expressed interest to use the facilities within the Agila Shipyard for its commercial shipbuilding purposes. They also have plans to establish a maintenance facility for the Philippine Navy ships within the shipyard, intended to maintain warships bought from the shipbuilder like the Jose Rizal-class frigate and the Miguel Malvar-class frigate.

By September 2024, Hyundai has been hiring and training workers in preparation of its full operations in January 2026.

== Facilities ==
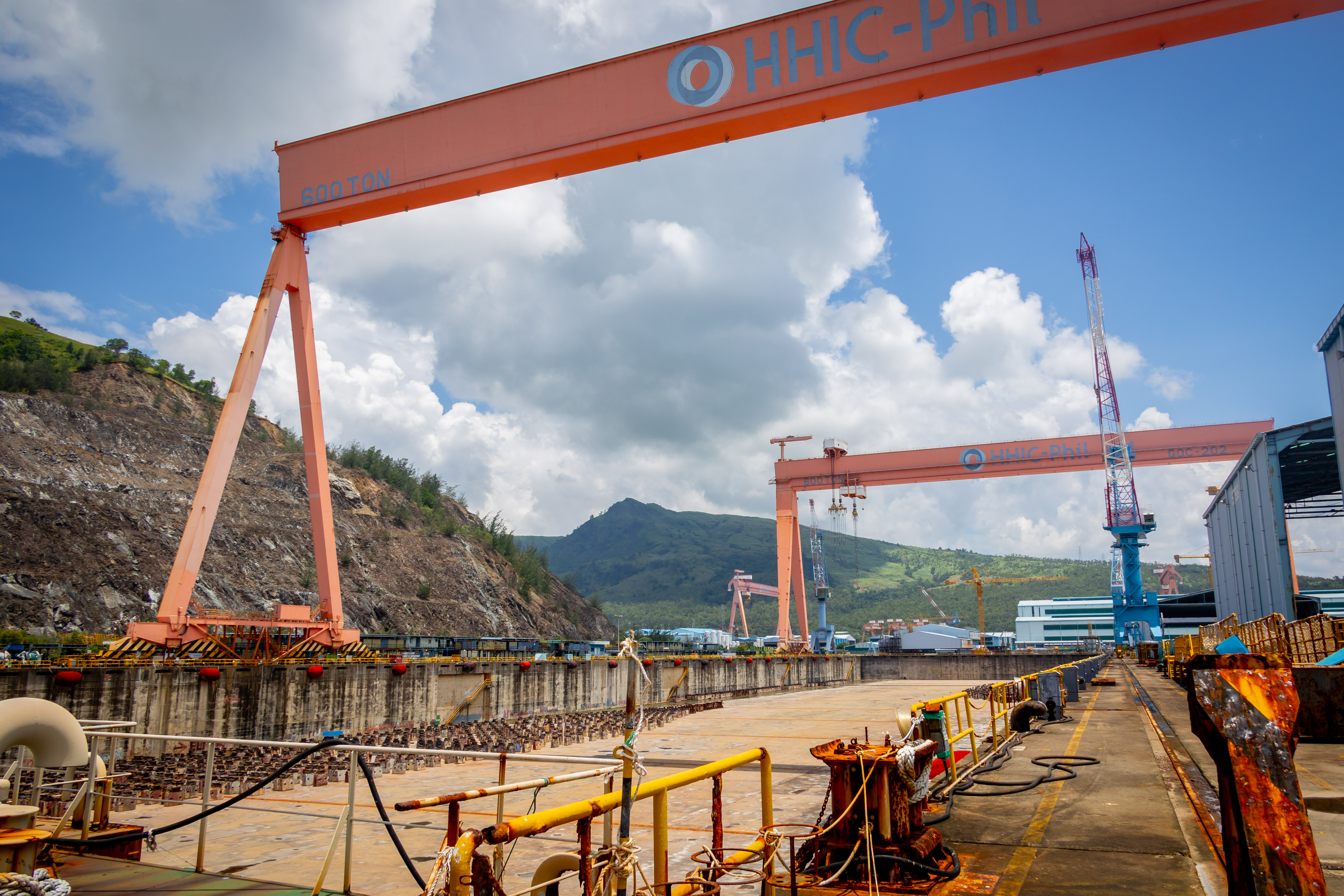
Facilities

The Hanjin Subic Shipyard covers an area of 300 hectares (740 acres) within the Subic Freeport Zone. As of 2015, it has a 500 m × 135 m (1,640 ft × 443 ft) dock, gantry cranes and an automated assembly line with 600,000 deadweight tonnage (DWT) of annual shipbuilding capacity.

=== Philippine Navy base ===
Naval Operating Base Subic
- Part of Agila Subic Shipyard
- Subic Freeport Zone, Subic, Zambales in the Philippines

Site information
- Type: Naval base
- Owner: Philippine Navy

Site history
- Built: 2022

The Philippine Navy occupies the northern yard of the shipyard. The portion is referred to as Naval Operating Base (NOB) Subic. The navy has previously considered turning the shipyard into a submarine base.
