= Batillus-class supertanker =

Class of supertanker ships

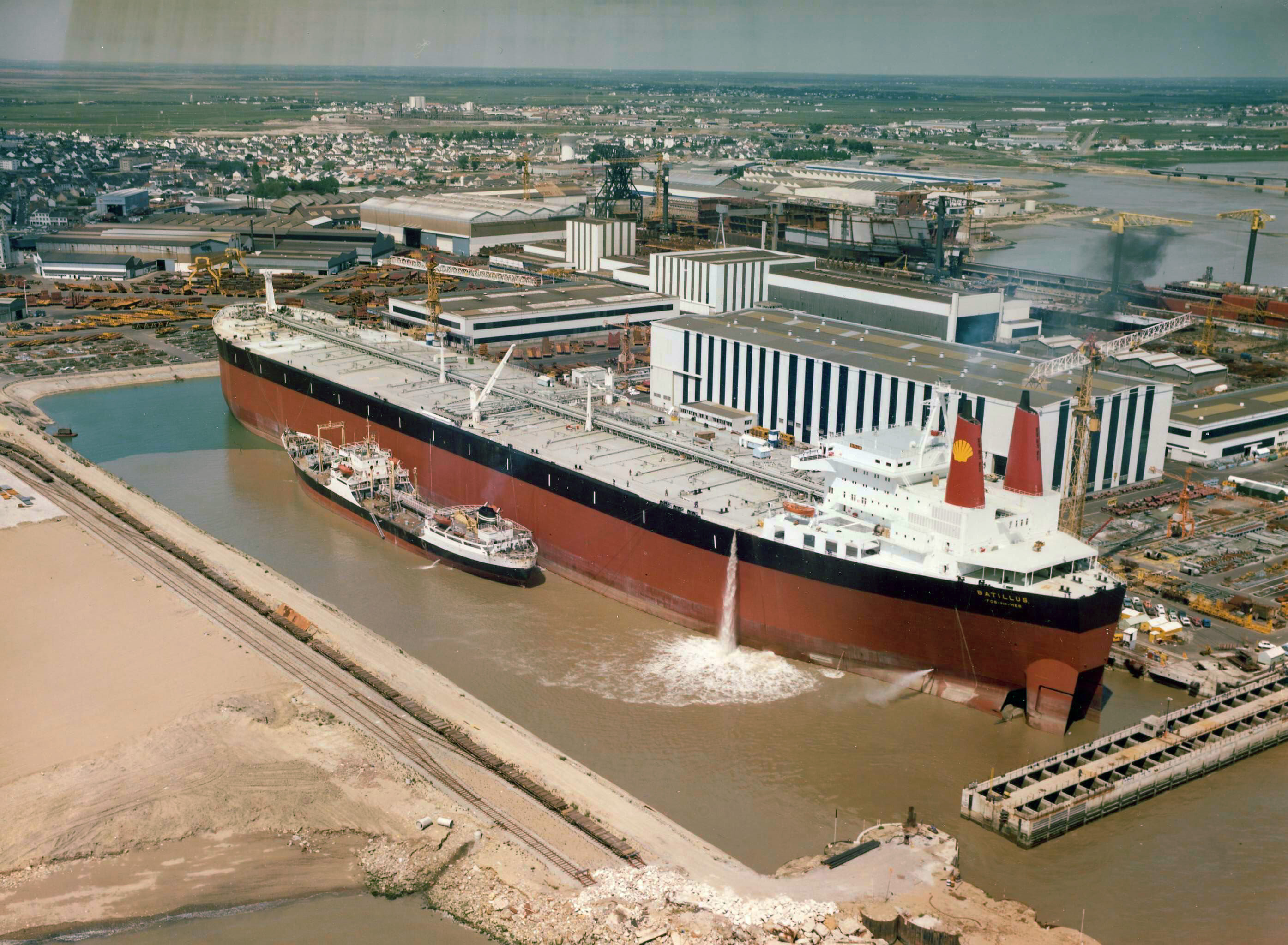
- The oil tanker Batillus at the end of her construction in Saint-Nazaire, being fueled.

Class overview
- Name: Batillus class
- Builders: Chantiers de l'Atlantique
- Operators: Société Maritime Shell France
- Succeeded by: TI-class supertanker
- Built: 1976-1979
- In service: 1976–2003
- Completed: 4
- Retired: 4

General characteristics
- Type: Supertanker
- Tonnage: 275,268 GT; 555,000 DWT; 225,473 NT
- Displacement: 77,300 tonnes light ship; 630,962 tonnes full load; (Batillus and Bellamya)
- Length: LOA: 414.22 m (1,359.0 ft) LBP: 401.10 m (1,315.9 ft)
- Beam: 63.01 m (206.7 ft)
- Draft: 28.5 m (94 ft)
- Depth: 35.92 m (117.8 ft)
- Installed power: 64,800 bhp (48.3 MW)
- Propulsion: 4 × Stal-Laval steam turbine engines; 2 × propellers
- Speed: 16 kn (30 km/h; 18 mph)

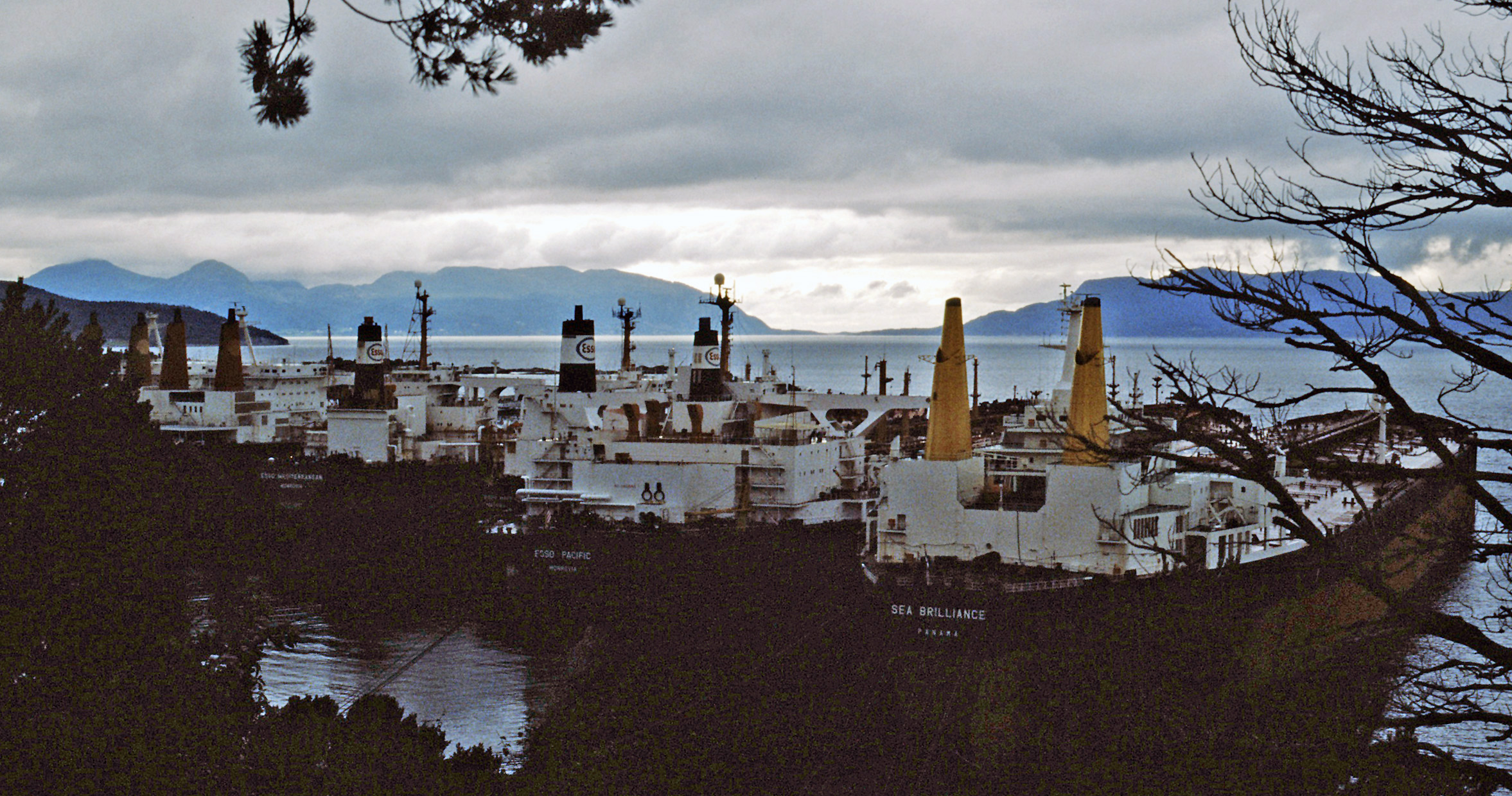
Sea Brilliance ex Prairial laid up with other tankers at Vestnes, Norway in July 1985.

The Batillus-class supertankers were a class of supertanker ships built in France in the late 1970s, with four ships of this class built between 1976 and 1979. Three of the ships were scrapped after less than ten years of oil transport service each, with the fourth one scrapped in 2003.

All four tankers were built in the Bassin C dock of the Chantiers de l'Atlantique shipyards at Saint Nazaire, France.

== History ==
=== Vessels in class ===
- Batillus, built in 1976, scrapped in 1986.
- Bellamya, built in 1976, scrapped in 1986.
- Pierre Guillaumat, built in 1977, scrapped in 1983.
- Prairial, built in 1979, renamed Sea Brilliance, renamed Hellas Fos, renamed Sea Giant, scrapped in 2003.

== Measurements ==
While being the largest ships ever built by gross tonnage until Pioneering Spirit, the four Batillus-class ships were the second largest ever constructed when measuring deadweight tonnage or length overall, behind only the supertanker Seawise Giant (renamed five times, including to Knock Nevis), which existed from 1979 to 2010.

While there were minor differences between the four Batillus-class ships, they all approached a gross tonnage (GT) of 275,000 and 555,000 tonnes deadweight (DWT) tonnage, and had a length overall of over 414 metres (1,358 ft) (longer than all but a few of the tallest skyscrapers in the world).

The Batillus class had a depth of nearly 36 metres (118 ft 1 in) from the main deck and a full load draft of 28.5 metres (93 ft 6 in), the greatest of any vessel, and slightly greater than the two Globtik Tokyo-class Ultra Large Crude Carriers (ULCCs).

Unlike Seawise Giant and most other ULCCs, the Batillus-class vessels had twin propellers, twin boilers of full size and power, and twin rudders. As a result, in the event of an engine or other failure, they could continue operation with the remaining propeller and boiler.

== See also ==
- List of world's longest ships
- TI-class supertanker
