= Jacques Saadé-class container ship =

China-built French cargo vessel

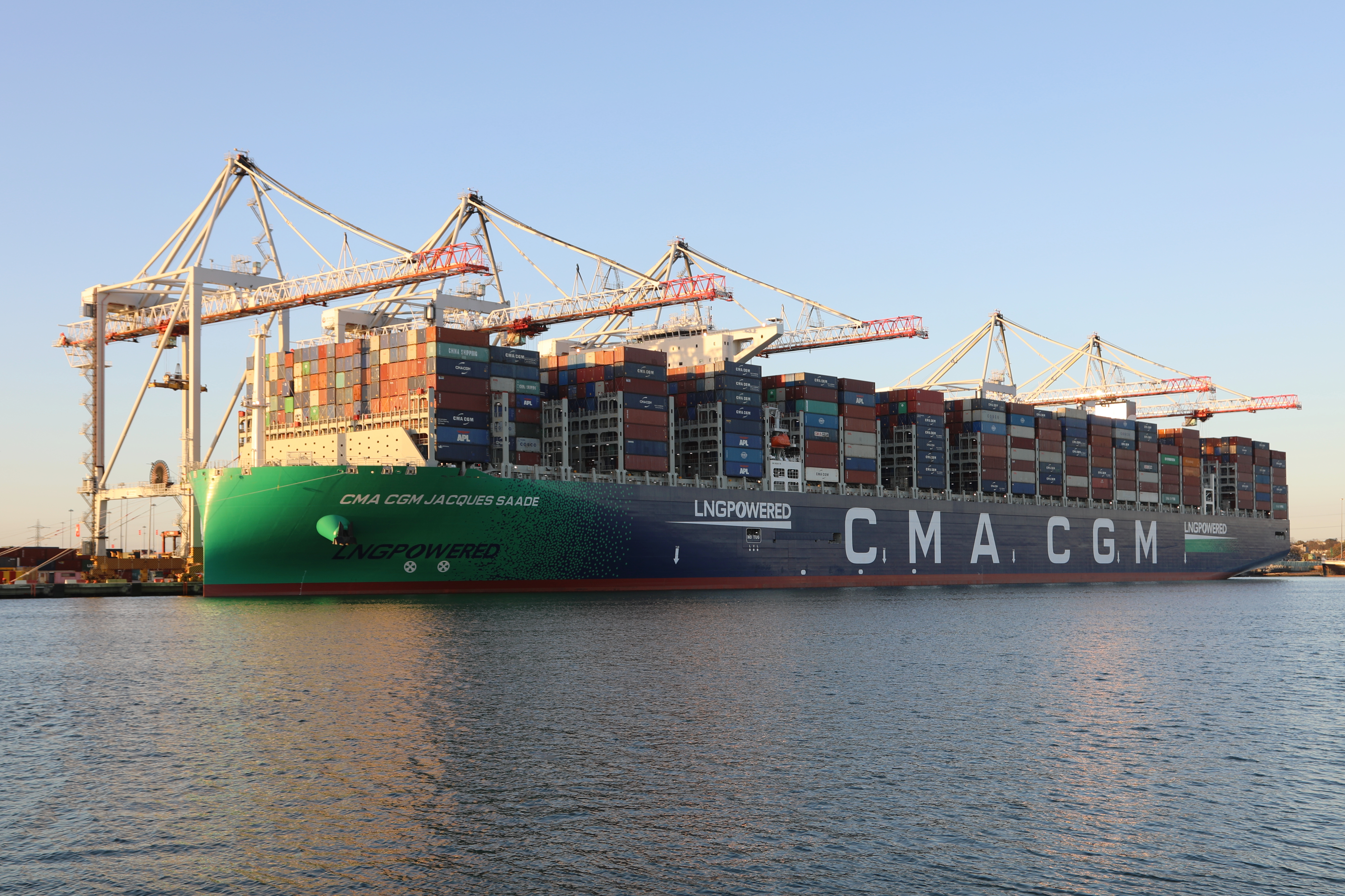
- CMA CGM Jacques Saadé at Southampton

Class overview
- Builders: Hudong-Zhonghua Shipbuilding; Jiangnan Shipyard
- Operators: CMA CGM
- In service: 2020–present
- Planned: 9
- Completed: 9
- Active: 9

General characteristics
- Type: Container ship
- Tonnage: 236,583 GT
- Length: 399.9 m (1,312 ft 0 in)
- Beam: 61.3 m (201 ft 1 in)
- Draught: 16 m (52 ft 6 in)
- Propulsion: CMD-WinGD 12X92 DF
- Capacity: 23,112 TEU

The Jacques Saadé class is a group of nine container ships each with a capacity of 23,000 TEUs built by the China State Shipbuilding Corporation (CSSC) for French shipping company CMA CGM. Construction on the first two began in July 2018 in Shanghai by Jiangnan Shipyard and Hudong-Zhonghua Shipbuilding. The first ship was launched in September 2019. The first ship was delivered on 22 September 2020. The first two ships were originally expected to be delivered in 2019, but they have been delivered in September and October 2020 after a delay of at least 10 months by China State Shipbuilding Corporation (CSSC).

== History ==
CSSC and CMA CGM signed a contract to produce the ships on 19 September 2017. The value of the contract was worth an estimated US$1.2 billion at the time.

Construction of the first two ships began on 26 July 2018. The first ship, CMA CGM Jacques Saadé, named after the founder of CMA CGM Jacques Saadé, was launched in September 2019. The first ship was originally expected to be delivered in November 2019, but it was delivered on 22 September 2020 after a delay of at least 10 months by China State Shipbuilding Corporation (CSSC). The second ship CMA CGM Champs Elysees was delivered on 27 October 2020 after a delay of at least 10 months. The ships are registered in Marseille.

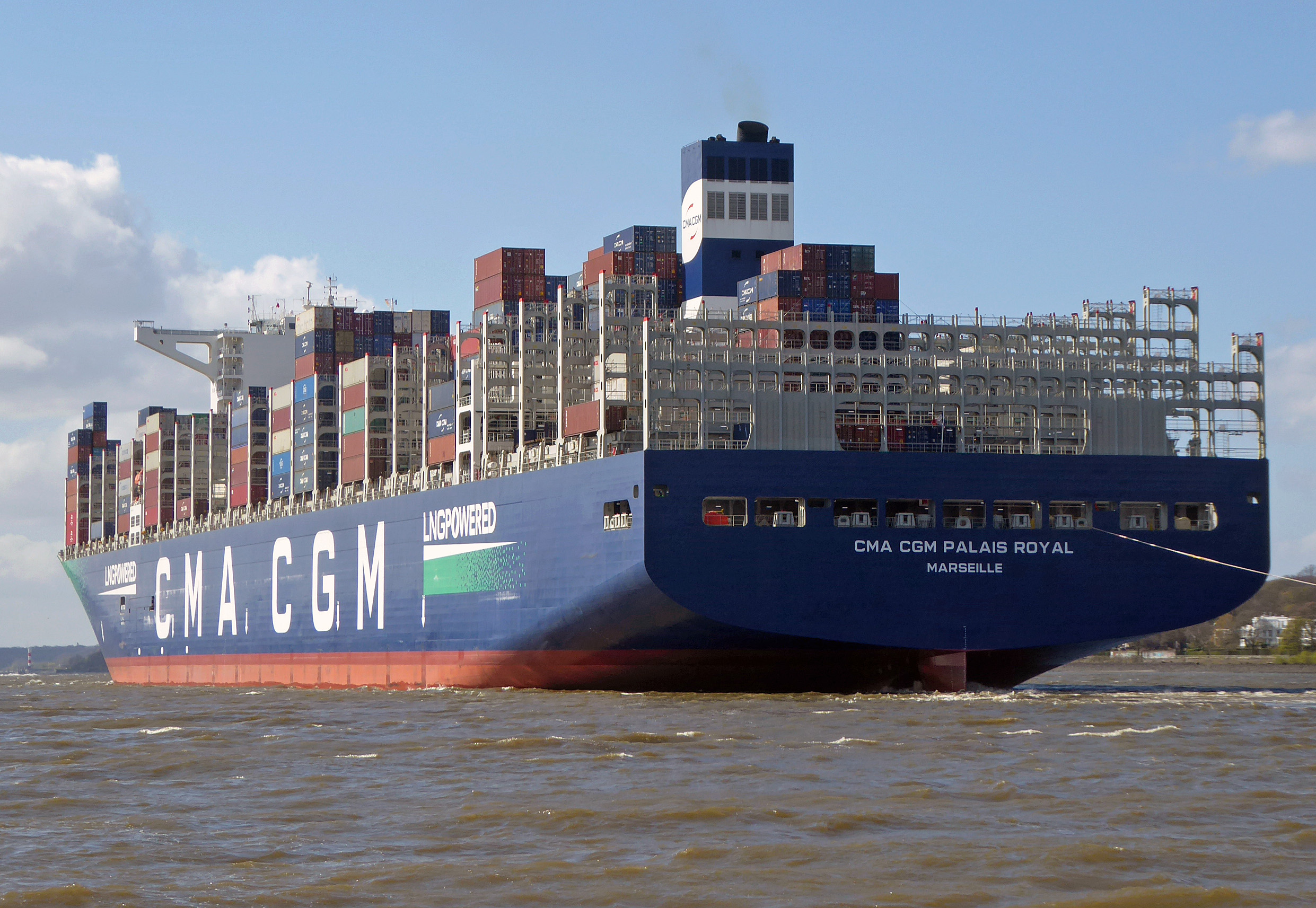
Stern view of CMA CGM Palais Royal

== List of ships ==
Ship	Yard number	IMO number	Delivery	Status	Ref
Shanghai Jiangnan Changxing Shipbuilding
CMA CGM Jacques Saadé	3033	9839179	22 September 2020	In service	
CMA CGM Palais Royal	3034	9839181	27 November 2020	In service	
CMA CGM Rivoli	3035	9839193	20 January 2021	In service	
CMA CGM Concorde	3036	9839208	28 April 2021	In service	
CMA CGM Sorbonne	3037	9839210	7 July 2021	In service	
Jiangnan Shipyard
CMA CGM Champs Elysees	1471	9839131	27 October 2020	In service	
CMA CGM Louvre	1472	9839143	22 December 2020	In service	
CMA CGM Montmartre	1473	9839155	18 March 2021	In service	
CMA CGM Trocadero	1474	9839167	26 May 2021	In service	

== Specifications ==
The vessels are 400 metres (1,312 ft 4 in) long, 61.3 metres (201 ft 1 in) wide, and 33.5 metres (109 ft 11 in) deep. They each have a deadweight tonnage capacity of 220,000 DWT.

The engines are the 12X92DF, designed by engine designer WinGD, fueled by liquefied natural gas (LNG). The decision to use LNG as a fuel is in anticipation of the upcoming 2020 IMO regulation limiting sulfur emissions.

== See also ==
- Antoine de Saint Exupery-class container ship
- Explorer-class container ship
- Argentina-class container ship
- A. Lincoln-class container ship
