= A. Lincoln-class container ship =

Container ship class

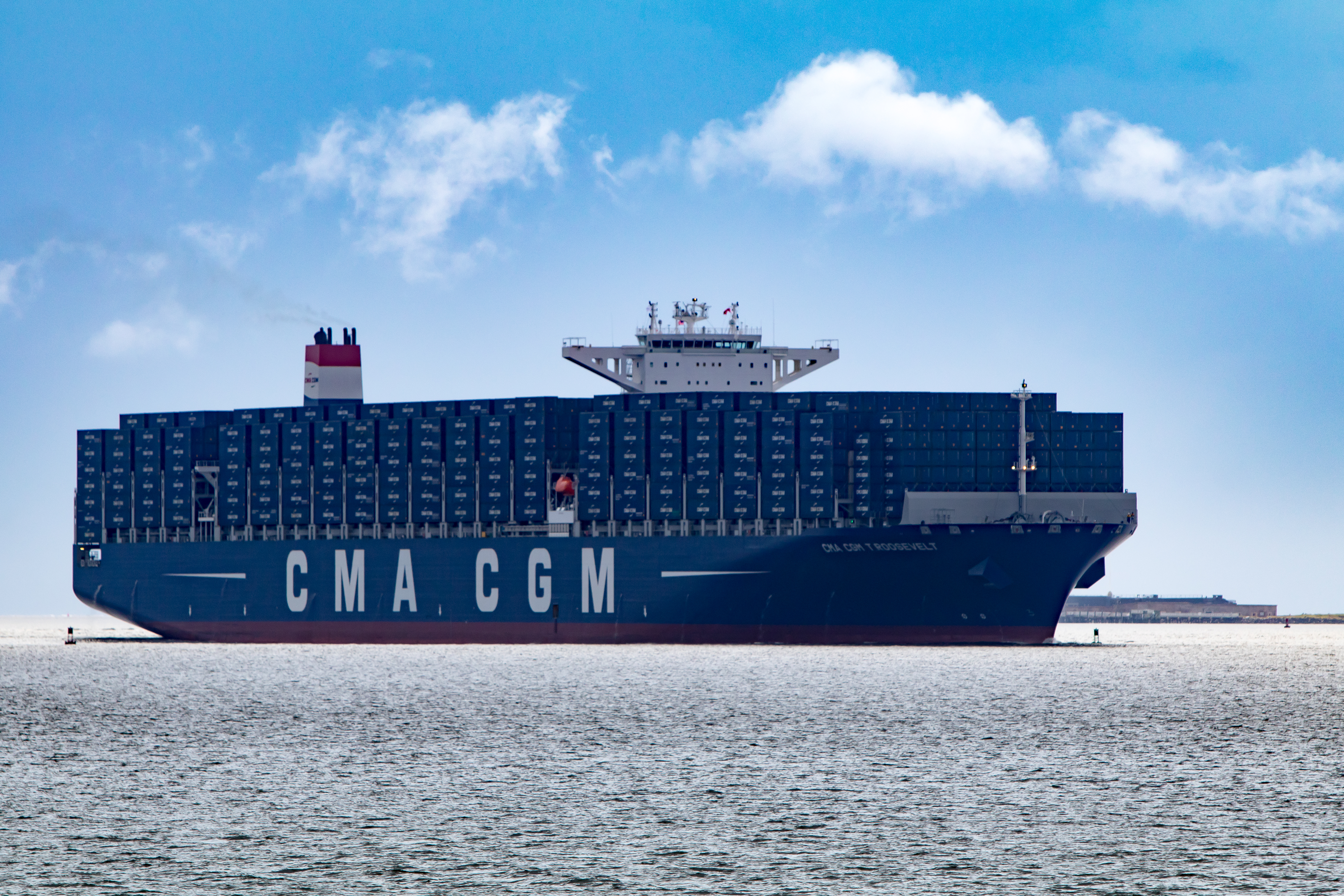
- CMA CGM T. Roosevelt entering Charleston Harbor

Class overview
- Builders: Hyundai Heavy Industries
- Operators: CMA CGM
- In service: 2017–present
- Planned: 6
- Completed: 6
- Active: 6

General characteristics
- Type: Container ship
- Tonnage: 140,872 GT
- Length: 365.96 m (1,200 ft 8 in)
- Beam: 48.2 m (158 ft 2 in)
- Draught: 16 m (52 ft 6 in)
- Capacity: 14,414 TEU

The A. Lincoln class is a series of six container ships built for CMA CGM. The ships were built by Hyundai Heavy Industries in South Korea. The ships have a maximum theoretical capacity of 14,414 TEU. The ships were ordered in 2015 with scheduled delivery early 2017.

On 22 August 2017, the CMA CGM T. Roosevelt set a new record for the largest ever container ship to cross the new Panama Canal. It held the record until 2019, when a larger container ship passed through the canal. The class is named after some of the most famous US presidents.

== List of ships ==
Ship	Yard number	IMO number	Delivery	Status	ref
CMA CGM A. Lincoln	2856	9780859	6 April 2017	In service	
CMA CGM G. Washington	2855	9780847	20 April 2017	In service	
CMA CGM T. Jefferson	2857	9780861	4 May 2017	In service	
CMA CGM T. Roosevelt	2858	9780873	25 July 2017	In service	
CMA CGM J. Adams	2859	9780885	25 July 2017	In service	
CMA CGM J. Madison	2860	9780897	20 March 2018	In service	

== See also ==
- Jacques Saadé-class container ship
- Antoine de Saint Exupery-class container ship
- Explorer-class container ship
