= CMA CGM Jacques Saadé =

China-built French cargo ship, the largest in the world fueled by LNG

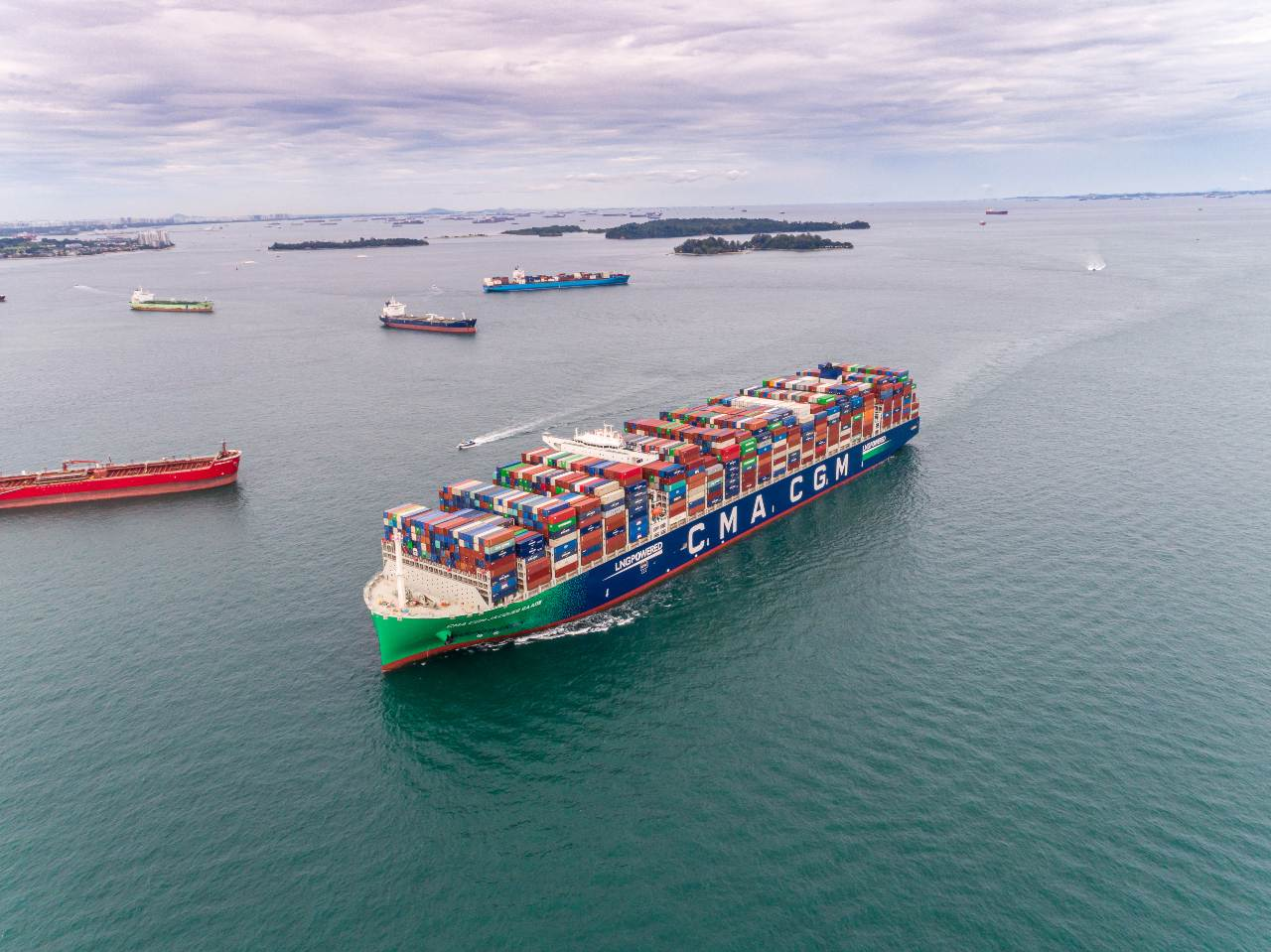
- CMA CGM Jacques Saadé

History
- Operator: CMA CGM
- Builder: China State Shipbuilding Corporation
- Launched: 25 September 2019
- In service: 2020

General characteristics
- Class & type: Jacques Saadé-class container ship
- Length: 399.9 m (1,312 ft 0 in)
- Beam: 61.3 m (201 ft 1 in)
- Draught: 16 m (52 ft 6 in)
- Propulsion: CMD-WinGD 12X92 DF
- Capacity: 23,112 TEU

CMA CGM Jacques Saadé is a container ship operated by CMA CGM. She entered commercial operation on 23 September 2020 and is the first of a class of nine sister ships which at the time of construction were the world's largest vessels to be powered using liquefied natural gas. She is named after Jacques Saadé, the founder of CMA CGM and has a capacity of 23,000 TEU). In her own category, she is the largest container ship to sail under the French flag.

== History ==
The CMA CGM Jacques Saadé is the first of a class of nine sister ships to be delivered following a decision taken by Rodolphe Saadé, chairman and chief executive officer of the CMA CGM Group, to order container ships powered by liquefied natural gas (LNG).

The ship was laid down in July 2018 at the CSSC shipyard in Shanghai, launched on 25 September 2019 and completed in September 2020. She was originally scheduled to be completed in November 2019 but was delayed by 10 months.

She entered commercial operation on 23 September 2020, on the French Asia Line route and is registered at the French International Register (RIF) with a home port of Marseille, where the CMA CGM Group's head office has been based for over 40 years.

== Design ==
At the time of construction she was the largest LNG-powered vessel ever built. She has a capacity of 23,000 TEU and measures 400 metres (1,300 ft) in length with a 61-metre (200 ft) overall beam and a height of 78 metres (256 ft).

With a fuel tank capacity of up to 18,600 cubic metres (660,000 cu ft) of LNG stored at a temperature of −161 °C (−258 °F), she is able to complete the full 23,372-nautical-mile (43,285 km; 26,896 mi) round trip between Asia and Northern Europe.

== See also ==
- Jacques Saadé-class container ship
- Hudong-Zhonghua Shipbuilding
