= Bellamya =

1976 ship

- The supertanker Bellamya

History
- Name: Bellamya
- Owner: Societe Maritime Shell, France
- Port of registry: (France) Fos-sur-Mer
- Builder: Chantiers de l'Atlantique, Saint-Nazaire, France
- Yard number: X 25
- Laid down: 1975
- Launched: 20 October 1976
- Completed: 1976
- Maiden voyage: 1976
- In service: 1976
- Out of service: 1984
- Identification: Call sign FNWL; IMO number: 7360100
- Fate: Scrapped at Ulsan, South Korea, in 1986.

General characteristics
- Class & type: Batillus-class supertanker
- Tonnage: 553,662 DWT; 274,276 GT ITC; 225,473 NT
- Displacement: 630,962 t (620,997 long tons)
- Length: 414.22 m (1,359 ft 0 in)
- Beam: 63.01 m (206 ft 9 in)
- Draft: 28.50 m (93 ft 6 in)
- Installed power: 48,300 kW (64,800 hp)
- Propulsion: 4 × Stal-Laval single reduced steam turbine engines; 2 × propellers
- Speed: 16 knots (30 km/h; 18 mph)

Bellamya was a supertanker, built in 1976 by Chantiers de l'Atlantique at Saint-Nazaire for the French branch of Shell Oil. She was the second Batillus-class supertanker. Bellamya, together with her sister ships Batillus, Pierre Guillaumat and Prairial, was one of the biggest ships in the world, surpassed in size only by Seawise Giant (later Jahre Viking, Happy Giant and Knock Nevis) built in 1976, and extended in 1981, although the four ships of the Batillus class had a larger gross tonnage. By gross tonnage—a measure of volume—Bellamya was the largest ship ever built.

== History ==
The contract to build the Batillus-class supertankers was signed on 6 April 1971, and the first sheet metal was cut in January 1975. Meanwhile, the oil shock caused by the Yom Kippur War in October 1973 resulted in higher oil prices and reduced imports by industrialized countries. The cancellation of the orders was seriously considered, but Shell concluded that it was better to continue, mostly to not put the shipyard in a very difficult position by withdrawing such a huge, already initiated project (the work commitments were already well advanced, with extremely heavy cancellation charges). It was also hoped for an improvement in market conditions.

The ship was completed and put in service in 1976, months after the completion of her sister ship Batillus, and that of the new, purposely built, oil terminal Antifer, near Le Havre, one of very few ports in the world capable of accommodating Batillus-class tankers. The international oil market however, did not improve; her size also placed restrictions on where she could be employed, and this must have led to her early demise. Active service ended when Bellamya was laid up at Vestnes, Norway, on 26 January 1984, and she arrived at Ulsan, South Korea, on 6 January 1986 to be scrapped.

== Technical data ==
Bellamya's length overall was 414.22 meters (1,359.0 ft), her beam was 63.01 m (206 ft 9 in), and draft 28.50 m (93 ft 6 in). The ship was measured at 553,662 tons deadweight (DWT), and 275,276 gross tonnage (GT). Propulsion was provided by two propellers each driven by two Stal-Laval steam turbines developing a total capacity of 48,300 kilowatts (64,800 hp). The service speed was 16.7 knots (30.9 km/h; 19.2 mph), with fuel consumption of about 330 metric tons (320 long tons; 360 short tons) of heavy oil per day and fuel enough for 42 days.

The cargo was carried in 40 tanks with a total volume of 677,300 cubic metres (4,260,000 bbl). They were divided into central and lateral tanks, whose dimensions was designed to reduce considerably the risk of pollution caused by collision or grounding. Ahead of the international standards of the time, the wing tanks had a maximum unit volume not exceeding 17,000 m^{3} (110,000 bbl), which was reduced to 9,000 m^{3} (57,000 bbl) in the most vulnerable parts of ship.
