= Pierre Guillaumat (supertanker) =

1977 ship

History
- Name: Pierre Guillaumat
- Owner: Compagnie Nationale de Navigation, France
- Operator: Elf Aquitaine
- Port of registry: (France) Le Havre
- Builder: Chantiers de l'Atlantique, Saint-Nazaire, France
- Yard number: D26
- Launched: 16 August 1977
- Completed: October 1977
- Maiden voyage: 1977
- In service: October 1977
- Out of service: 1983
- Identification: IMO number: 7360150
- Fate: Scrapped at Ulsan, South Korea, in October 1983.

General characteristics
- Class & type: Batillus-class supertanker
- Tonnage: 555,051 DWT; 274,838 GRT; 224,831 NRT
- Length: 414.23 m (1,359 ft 0 in)
- Beam: 63.05 m (206 ft 10 in)
- Draft: 28.603 m (93 ft 10.1 in)
- Installed power: 47,840 kW (64,150 hp)
- Propulsion: 4 × Stal-Laval single reduced steam turbine engines; 2 × propellers
- Speed: 16 knots (30 km/h; 18 mph)

Pierre Guillaumat was a supertanker built in 1977 by Chantiers de l'Atlantique at Saint-Nazaire for Compagnie Nationale de Navigation. It was the third vessel of the Batillus-class supertanker and distinguished for being the biggest ship ever constructed (by gross register tonnage). It was surpassed in length, deadweight tonnage and displacement only by Seawise Giant, which, though it was originally smaller when it was built in 1976, was subsequently lengthened and enlarged.

It was named after the French politician and founder of Elf Aquitaine oil industry, Pierre Guillaumat, and was completed in 1977. However, the poor state of the tanker market, accentuated by the huge dimensions of the ship that restricted where it could be employed, meant that Pierre Guillaumat was unprofitable for most of its career and the vessel was laid up at Fujairah anchorage on 2 February 1983. Later that year, it was bought by the Hyundai Corporation and renamed Ulsan Master, she arrived at Ulsan, South Korea for demolition on 19 October 1983.

Its gigantic proportions left Pierre Guillaumat with very limited employment opportunities. The vessel could not pass through the Panama Canal, and its draft meant it was only able to enter a small number of ports. It was therefore often moored at offshore rigs and oil terminals such as Antifer and, after lightering to reduce her draft, at Europoort.

== Technical data ==
The vessel's length overall was 414.23 meters (1,359 ft 0 in), its beam 63.05 m (206 ft 10 in), draft 28.603 m (93.84 ft), and measured 555,051 tons deadweight (DWT), and 274,838 gross register tons (GRT). Propulsion was provided by two propellers each driven by two Stal-Laval steam turbines developing a total power of 48,000 kilowatts (65,000 hp). The service speed was 16.7 knots (30.9 km/h; 19.2 mph), with fuel consumption of about 330 metric tons (320 long tons; 360 short tons) of heavy oil per day and fuel enough for 42 days.

The cargo was carried in 40 tanks with a total volume of 677,300 m^{3} (4,260,000 bbl). They were divided into central and lateral tanks, whose dimensions were designed to reduce considerably the risk of pollution caused by collision or grounding. Ahead of the international standards of the time, the wing tanks had a maximum unit volume not exceeding 17,000 m^{3} (110,000 bbl), which was reduced to 9,000 m^{3} (57,000 bbl) in the most vulnerable parts of ship.

== See also ==
- Batillus
- Bellamya
- Prairial
