= Antoine de Saint Exupery-class container ship =

French cargo vessel, owned by CMA CGM

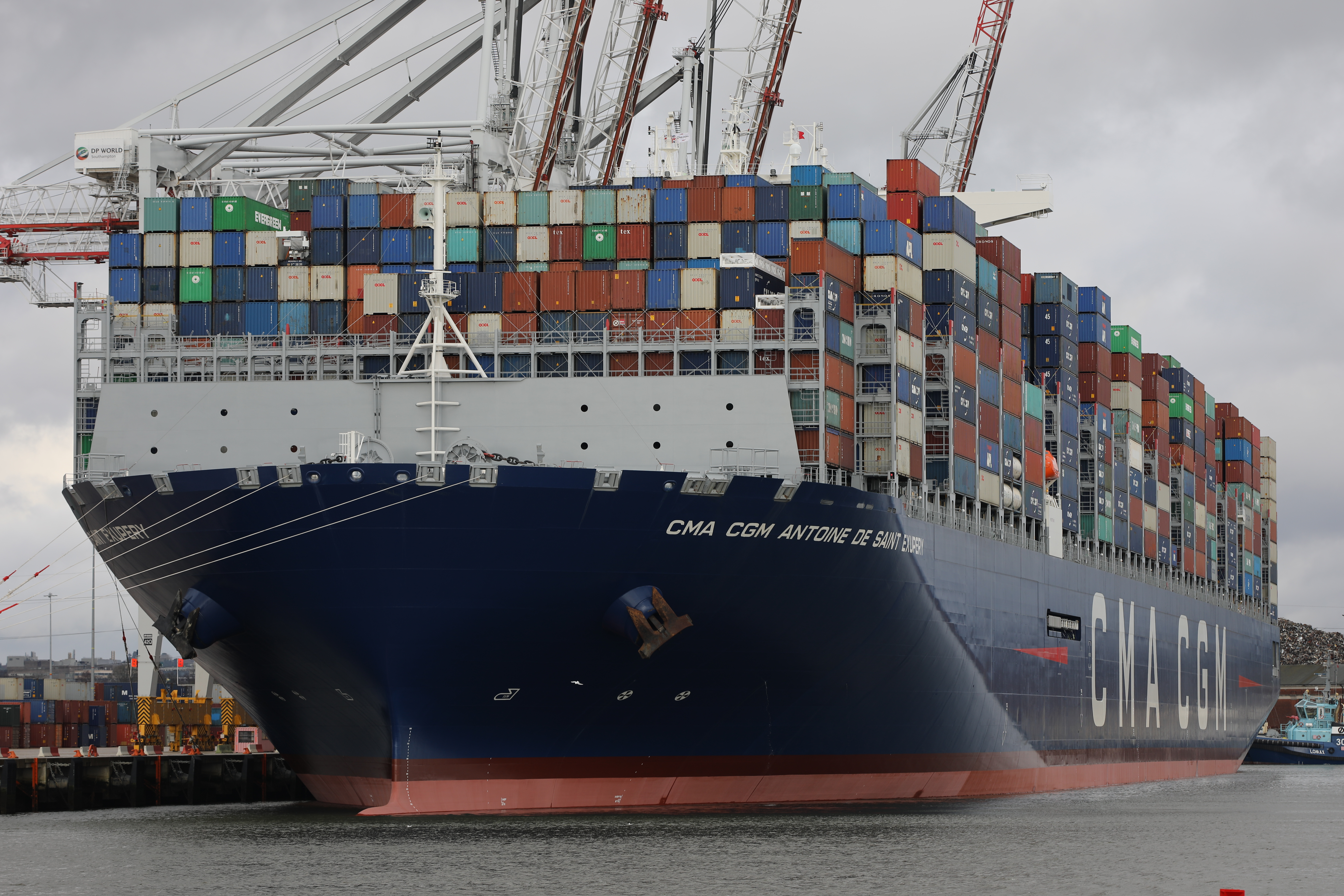
- CMA CGM Antoine de Saint Exupery in the port of Southampton

Class overview
- Builders: Hanjin Heavy Industries and Construction Philippines
- Operators: CMA CGM
- In service: 2018–present
- Planned: 3
- Completed: 3
- Active: 3

General characteristics
- Type: Container ship
- Tonnage: 219,277 GT
- Length: 400 m (1,312 ft 4 in)
- Beam: 59 m (193 ft 7 in)
- Draught: 15.8 m (51 ft 10 in)
- Capacity: 20,954 TEU

The Antoine de Saint-Exupéry class is a series of three container ships built for CMA CGM. The ships have a maximum theoretical capacity of 20,954 TEU. The ships were built by Hanjin Heavy Industries and Construction Philippines.

== List of ships ==
Ship	Yard number	IMO number	Delivery	Status	ref
CMA CGM Antoine de Saint Exupery	P0149	9776418	26 January 2018	In service	
CMA CGM Jean Mermoz	P0150	9776420	25 May 2018	In service	
CMA CGM Louis Blériot	P0151	9776432	9 October 2018	In service	

== See also ==
- Jacques Saadé-class container ship
- Explorer-class container ship
- A. Lincoln-class container ship
