= Prairial (supertanker) =

Supertanker built in 1979

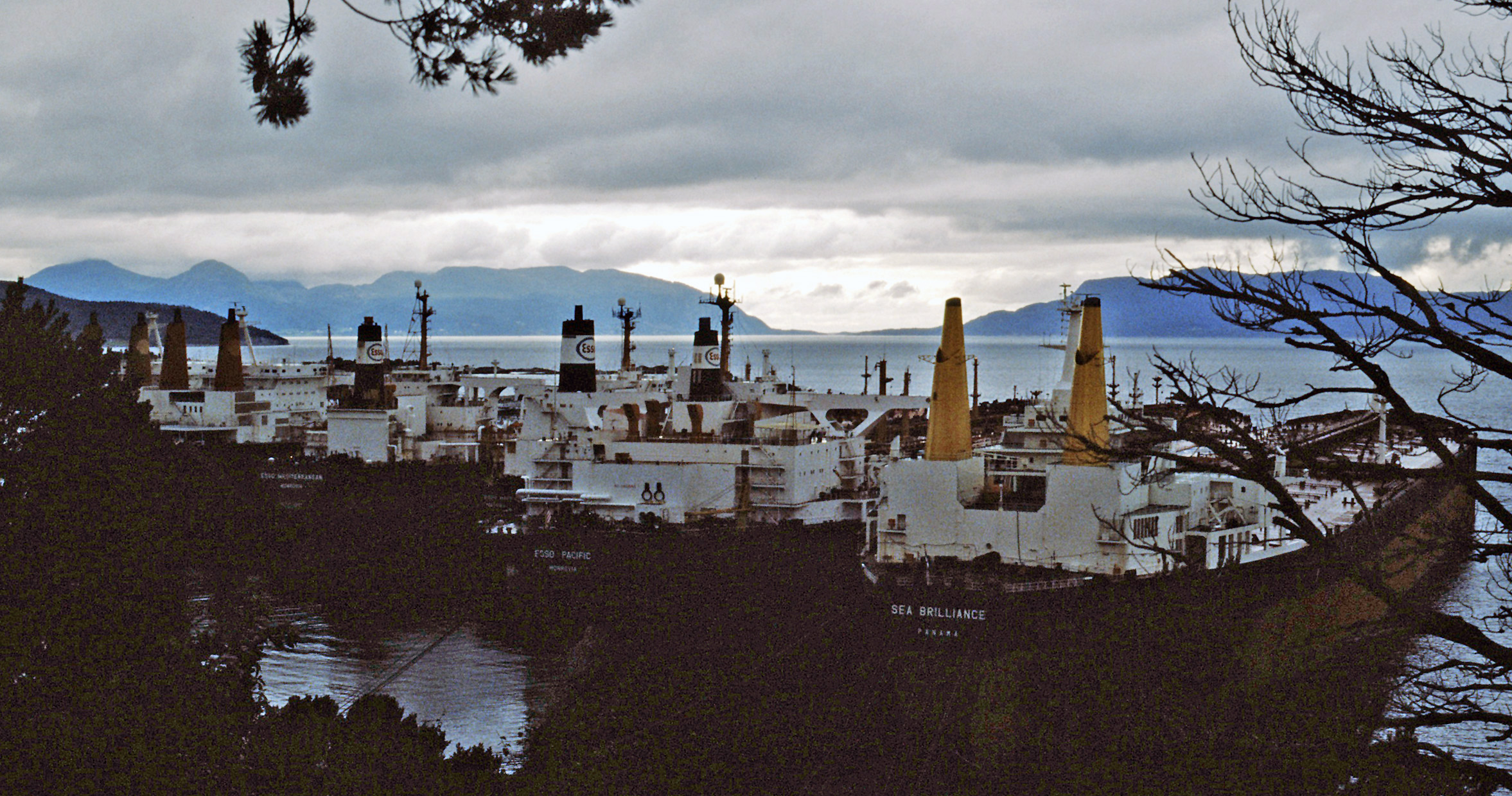
- Prairial as Sea Brilliance in July 1985.

History
- Name: Prairial
- Owner: Compagnie Nationale de Navigation, France (as completed)
- Operator: Elf Aquitaine (as completed)
- Port of registry: (France) Le Havre (as Prairial); Panama City (as Sea Brilliance); (Greece) Piraeus (as Hellas Fos); (Liberia) Monrovia (as Sea Giant)
- Builder: Chantiers de l'Atlantique, Saint-Nazaire, France
- Yard number: H26
- Launched: September 21, 1979
- Completed: December 1979
- Maiden voyage: 1979
- In service: December 1979
- Out of service: 2003
- Identification: IMO number: 7408720
- Fate: Scrapped in Gadani ship-breaking yard, Pakistan, September 2003.

General characteristics
- Class & type: Batillus-class ULCC
- Tonnage: 555,046 DWT; 274,826 GT ITC
- Length: 414.22 m (1,359 ft 0 in)
- Beam: 63.05 m (206 ft 10 in)
- Draft: 28.60 m (93 ft 10 in)
- Installed power: 47,840 kW (65,000 horsepower)
- Propulsion: 4 × Stal-Laval single reduced steam turbine engines; 2 × propellers
- Speed: 16 knots (30 km/h)

Prairial was a supertanker, built in 1979 by Chantiers de l'Atlantique at Saint-Nazaire for Compagnie Nationale de Navigation. Prairial, which was the fourth and final vessel of Batillus-class supertankers (the other three were Batillus, Bellamya and Pierre Guillaumat). She was the only ship of that class to have a career longer than ten years, sailing until 2003, although under different names: Sea Brilliance (1985), Hellas Fos (1986) and Sea Giant (1997). She is also distinguished as the third biggest ship ever constructed, surpassed in size only by Seawise Giant (later Jahre Viking, Happy Giant, Knock Nevis, and finally Mont) built in 1976 and subsequently lengthened, and her sister ship Pierre Guillaumat.

The vessel was completed and commissioned in 1979. As other ships of Batillus class, she was laid up, arriving at Vestnes, Norway on April 5, 1983, but was sold and recommissioned in 1985. She was in service under different names and owners until 2003, when she arrived at Gadani ship-breaking yard in order to be scrapped.

== Technical data ==
Length overall was 414.22 m (1,359 ft 0 in), beam 63.05 m (206 ft 10 in), draft 28.60 m (93 ft 10 in), deadweight tonnage 555,046 (however, if she were loaded to the same freeboard as the Seawise Giant, at 233 tons/cm., her deadweight tonnage would have been on the order of 604,000 tonnes, unrivaled in maritime history), and gross tonnage 274,826. Propulsion was provided by two propellers each driven by two Stal-Laval steam turbines developing a total power of 65,000 Hp. The service speed was 16.7 knots, with fuel consumption of about 330 tonnes of heavy oil per day and fuel enough for 42 days.

The cargo was carried in 40 tanks with a total volume of 677,300 m^{3}. They were divided into central and lateral tanks, whose dimensions was designed to reduce considerably the risk of pollution caused by collision or grounding. Ahead of the international standards of the time, the wing tanks had a maximum unit volume not exceeding 17,000 m^{3}, which was reduced to 9,000 m^{3} in the most vulnerable parts of ship.
