= Batillus =

French supertanker

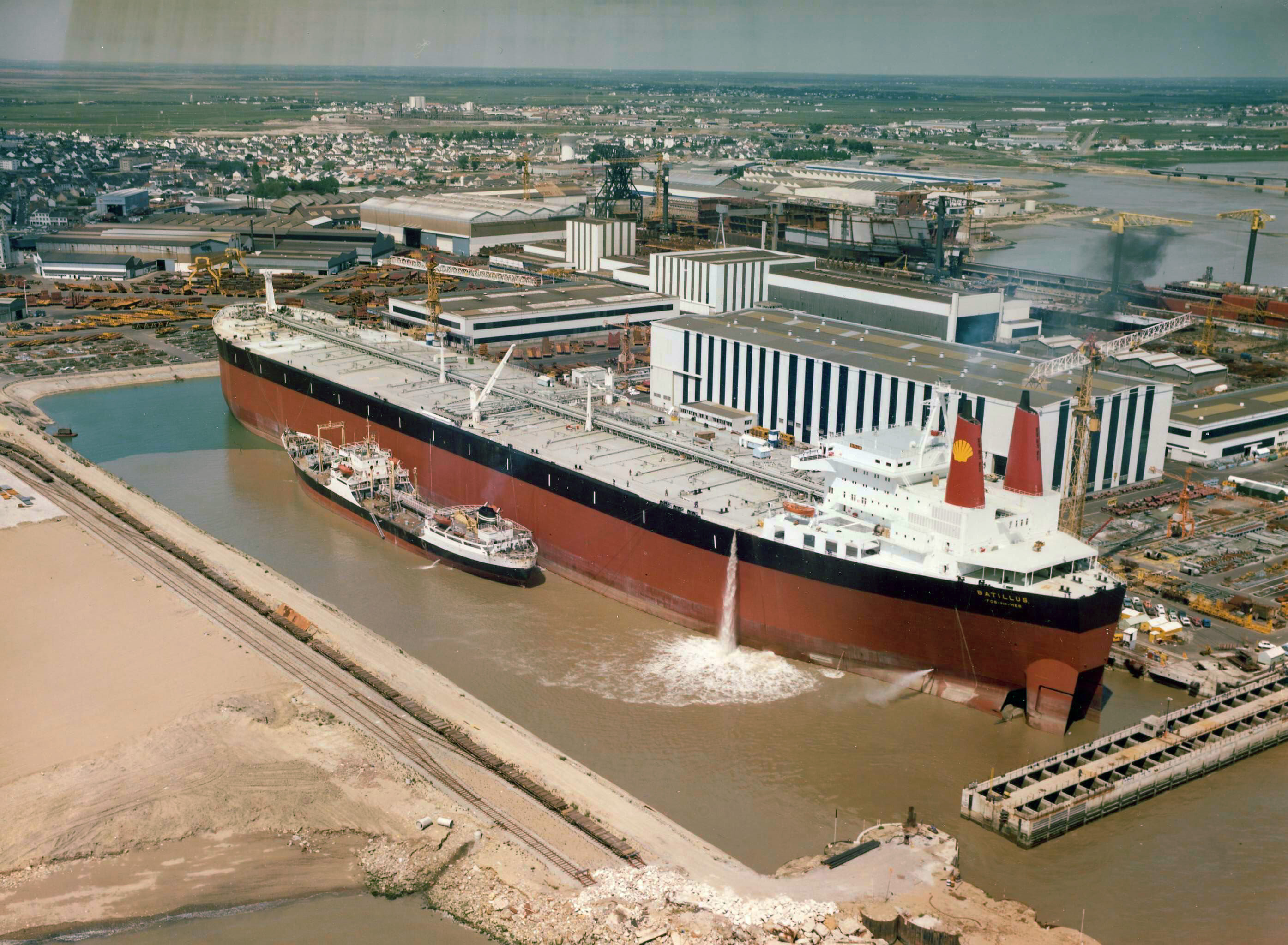
- Batillus at the end of her construction in Saint-Nazaire

History
- Name: Batillus.
- Owner: Societe Maritime Shell, France
- Port of registry: (France) Fos-sur-Mer
- Builder: Chantiers de l'Atlantique, Saint-Nazaire, France
- Yard number: V 25
- Laid down: 18 May 1975
- Launched: 25 June 1976
- Completed: 1976
- Maiden voyage: 1976
- In service: 1976
- Out of service: 1983
- Identification: Call sign FNWJ; IMO number: 7360095
- Fate: Scrapped at Kaohsiung, Taiwan, in 1985.

General characteristics
- Type: Supertanker
- Tonnage: 553,662 DWT; 275,268 GT ITC; 225,473 NT
- Displacement: 630,962 t (620,997 long tons)
- Length: 414.22 m (1,359 ft 0 in)
- Beam: 63.01 m (206 ft 9 in)
- Draft: 28.50 m (93 ft 6 in)
- Installed power: 67,800 hp (50,600 kW)
- Propulsion: 4 × Stal-Laval single reduced steam turbine engines; 2 × propellers
- Speed: 16 knots (30 km/h; 18 mph)

Batillus was a supertanker built in 1976 by Chantiers de l'Atlantique at Saint-Nazaire for the French branch of Shell Oil. The first vessel of the Batillus class, she was, together with her sister ships Bellamya, Pierre Guillaumat and Prairial, one of the biggest ships in the world, surpassed in size only by Seawise Giant (later Jahre Viking, Happy Giant and Knock Nevis) built in 1976, and extended in 1981, although the four ships of the Batillus class had a larger gross tonnage. She was sold for scrap in 1985 after a prolonged downturn in the oil market made her economically impractical.

== History ==
The contract to build the Batillus-class supertankers was signed on 6 April 1971, and the first sheet metal was cut in January 1975. Meanwhile, the oil shock caused by the Yom Kippur War in October 1973, resulted in higher oil prices and reduction of imports from industrialized countries. The cancellation of the order had been seriously considered, but Shell concluded that it was better to continue, mostly to not put the shipyard in very difficult position with withdrawal of such a huge, already initiated project, (the work commitments were already well advanced, with extremely heavy cancellation charges) hoping also on better times in future.

The ship was completed and put in service in 1976, simultaneously with new, purposely built, oil terminal Antifer, near Le Havre, one of very few ports in the world capable of accommodating Batillus-class tankers. Her first captain was Roger Priser. She made a total of 25 voyages between the Persian Gulf and northern Europe, and one-off sail between the Persian Gulf and Curaçao in June–July 1977, a total of 20 dockings to Antifer. In the Persian Gulf, oil terminals that served were Mina al Fahal (Oman), Halul island (Qatar), Kharg Island (Iran), Ras Tanura, Ras al-Ju'aymah (Saudi Arabia), Mina Al-Ahmadi and Sea Island (Kuwait). In Europe, the only other port of call was Europoort, Rotterdam, but there were also transloadings at sea to smaller units in England and Irish Sea.

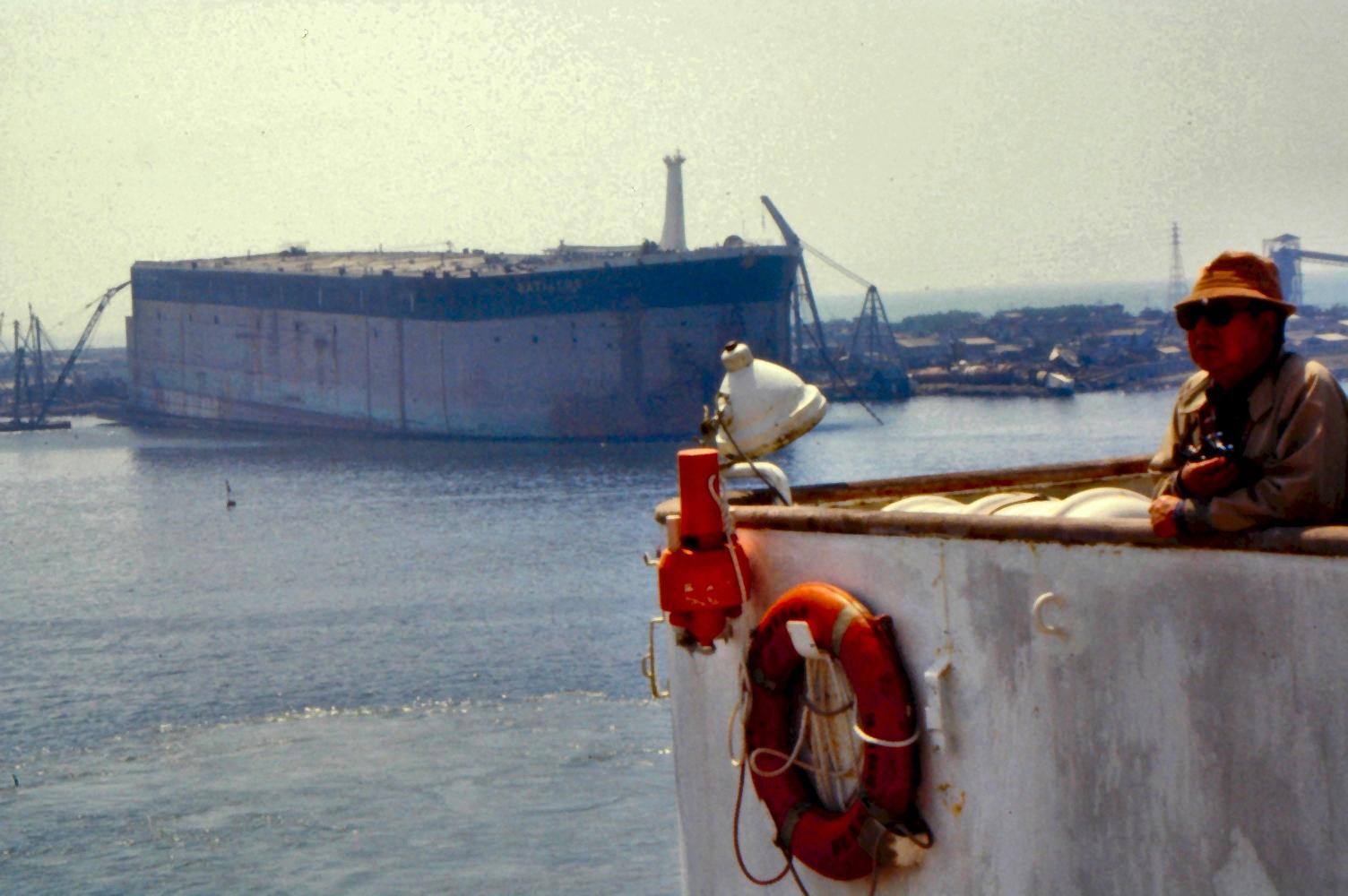
Batillus during her scrapping at Kaohsiung in 1986.

The international oil market, however, did not improve, and while from 1977 to 1980, Batillus performed four to five regular trips per year, she had a bit more than two trips in 1981 and three in 1982. From early November 1982, she was in permanent waiting for cargo at the Gulf entrance, until June 1983 when the last oil shipment was embarked. From 22 August 1983, to 8 November 1985, Batillus was moored at Vestnes, Norway. On 17 October 1985, Royal Dutch Shell decided to sell the ship for scrap, for less than $8 million. Her last voyage was from Vestnes to Kaohsiung, Taiwan, where she arrived on 28 December 1985, to be scrapped.

== Technical data ==
The ship's length overall was 414.22 meters (1,359 ft 0 in), her beam 63.01 m (206 ft 9 in), and draft 28.50 m (93 ft 6 in). Batillus was measured at 553,662 tons deadweight (DWT) and 273,550 gross tonnage (GT). Propulsion was provided by two propellers each driven by two Stal-Laval steam turbines developing a single capacity of 24,200 kilowatts (32,500 hp) per turbine. The service speed was 16.7 knots (30.9 km/h; 19.2 mph), with fuel consumption of about 330 metric tons (320 long tons; 360 short tons) of heavy oil per day and fuel enough for 42 days.

The cargo was carried in 40 tanks with a total volume of 677,300 m^{3} (4,260,000 bbl). They were divided into central and lateral tanks, whose dimensions were designed to considerably reduce the risk of pollution caused by collision or grounding. Ahead of the international standards of the time, the wing tanks had a maximum unit volume not exceeding 17,000 m^{3} (110,000 bbl), which was reduced to 9,000 m^{3} (57,000 bbl) in the most vulnerable parts of ship.
