= CMA CGM Antoine de Saint Exupery =

Filipino-built French-Maltese cargo ship

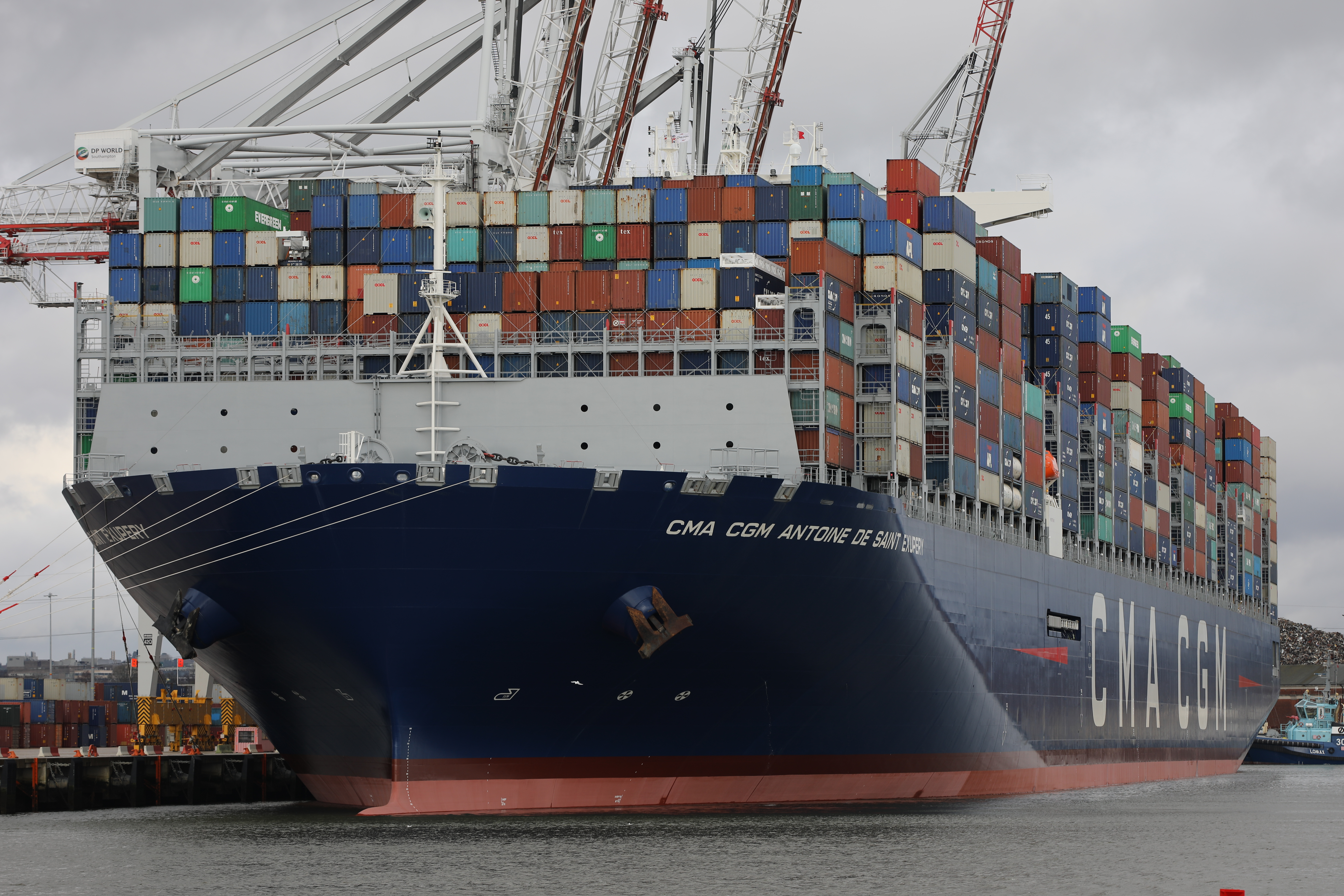
- CMA CGM Antoine de Saint Exupery docked at the Port of Southampton

History

France
- Name: CMA CGM Antoine de Saint Exupery
- Namesake: Antoine de Saint-Exupéry
- Owner: CMA CGM
- Operator: CMA CGM
- Port of registry: Valletta, Malta
- Ordered: 2015
- Builder: Hanjin Heavy Industries and Construction Philippines
- Launched: 2017
- In service: 2018
- Identification: Call sign: 9HA5316; IMO number: 9776418
- Status: In service

General characteristics
- Class & type: Antoine de Saint Exupery-class container ship
- Tonnage: 217,673 GT; 102,356 NT; 199,855 DWT
- Length: 400 m (1,312 ft 4 in)
- Beam: 59 m (193 ft 7 in)
- Draught: 16 m (52 ft 6 in)
- Depth: 33 m (108 ft 3 in) (deck edge to keel)
- Installed power: 1 × Winterthur Gas & Diesel X92
- Speed: 22 knots (41 km/h; 25 mph)
- Capacity: 20,954 TEU

CMA CGM Antoine de Saint Exupery is a container ship that is operated by French shipping company CMA CGM. As the lead ship of her class, she is the flagship of CMA CGM's fleet.

Named after the French author and aviator, CMA CGM Antoine de Saint Exupery was ordered in April the 1st 2015 as the first of three sister ships from Hanjin Heavy Industries and Construction Philippines. It was launched in August 2017, and after fitting out underwent sea trials in late December 2017 and early January 2018. She was delivered to CMA CGM on 25 January 2018, ahead of her entry into service on 6 February on a routing from southeast Asia to northern Europe.

CMA CGM Antoine de Saint Exupery measures 217,673 gross tons, and is 400m long, with a beam of 59 metres (194 ft) and a draft of 16 metres (52 ft) . She is powered by a Winterthur Gas & Diesel model X92 low speed diesel engine, with a power output up to 73,560 kilowatts (98,650 hp) that can propel her at up to 22 knots (25 mph or 40 km/h). She has a capacity of 20,954 TEUs.
