= Globtik Tokyo =

Oil tanker built in 1973

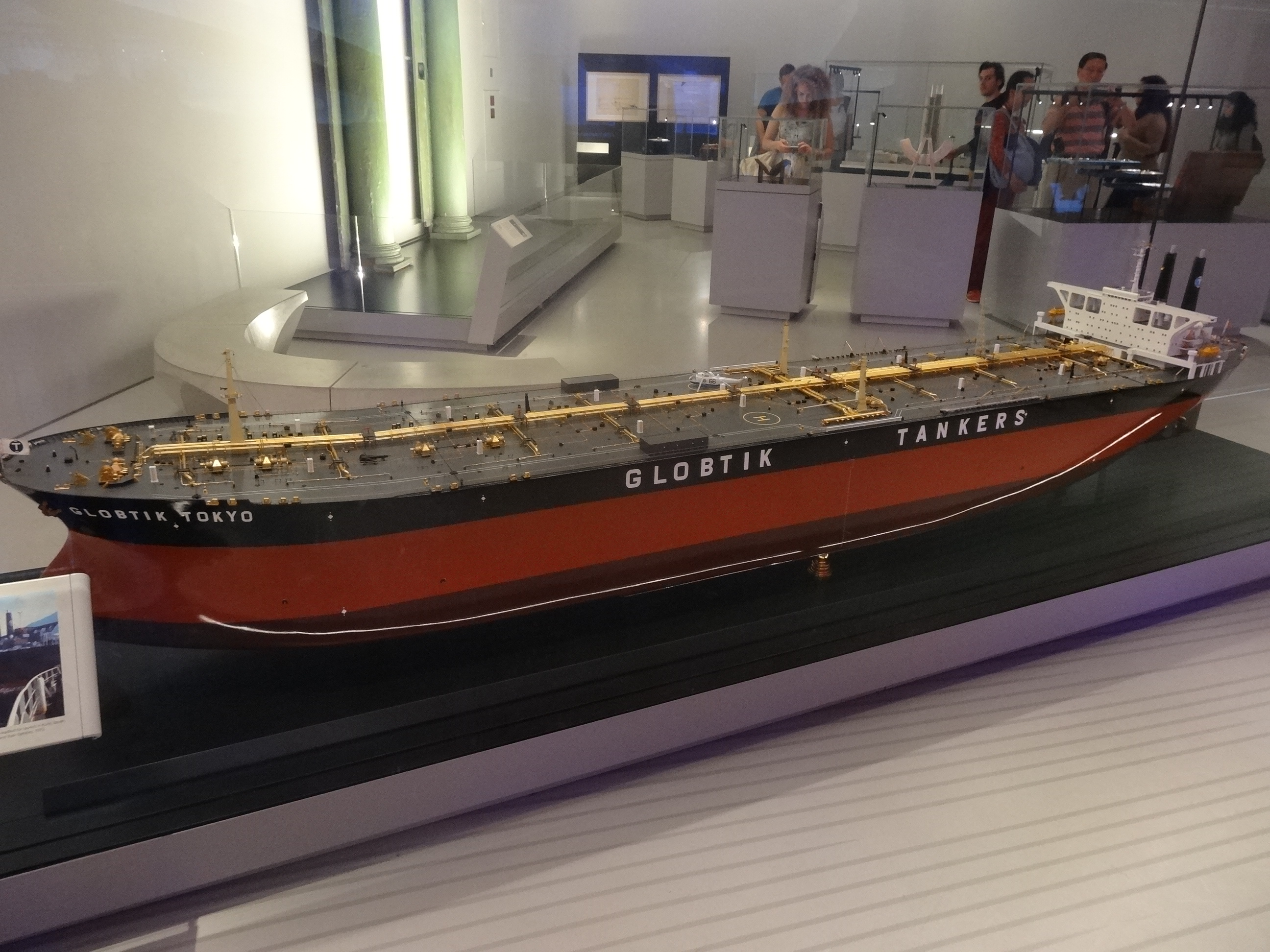
- Model of Globtik Tokyo at the Science Museum, London

History
- Name: Globtik Tokyo
- Owner: Globtik Tankers Ltd. (1973–1979); Norop Tankers Corp. (1979–1986)
- Port of registry: London, (United Kingdom) (1973–1979); Liberia (1979–1986)
- Builder: Ishikawajima Harima Heavy Industries Co. Ltd., Kure, Japan
- Yard number: 2239
- Laid down: 3 April 1972
- Launched: 14 October 1972
- Completed: 20 February 1973
- In service: 1973
- Out of service: 1986
- Identification: IMO number: 7229942
- Fate: Broken up

General characteristics
- Type: Crude oil tanker
- Tonnage: 238,232 GT; 184,190 NT; 483,684 DWT
- Length: LOA 378.88 m (1,243 ft 1 in); LPP 359.98 m (1,181 ft 0 in)
- Beam: 62.06 m (203 ft 7 in)
- Draught: 28.201 m (92 ft 6.3 in)
- Installed power: Steam turbine, 33,570 kW (45,020 hp)
- Speed: 17 kn (31 km/h; 20 mph) (ballast)

Globtik Tokyo was one of three oil tankers in its class. At the time her keel was laid in 1972 she was the largest supertanker in the world at 378.85 metres (1,242 ft 11 in) and 483,684 tons deadweight (DWT). She held that distinction until 1973 when her sister ship, Globtik London, was launched. Identical in size Globtik London was larger by 276 DWT. Both ships had a hold capacity of 580,000,000 litres (3,600,000 bbl).

Owned by Globtik Tankers, London they were built by Ishikawajima Harima Heavy Industries in Kure, Japan, now known as IHI Corporation. Both ships have been retired from service and broken up for scrap, Globtik London in 1985 and Globtik Tokyo in 1986.

The third and largest ship in this class was the 484,276 DWT Nissei Maru, owned by Tokyo Tankers built in 1975 and scrapped in 2003.

== Propulsion ==
The Globtik Tokyo was powered by steam turbines totaling 34,000 kilowatts (45,000 hp)r geared to a single shaft. The drive system was capable of 16 knots (30 km/h; 18 mph), 17 knots (31 km/h; 20 mph) under ballasted load conditions (empty hold). Surprisingly nimble for a ship her size, she had a turning circle shorter than three times her length and could stop in under 3 miles (4.8 km) with her single screw in reverse.

== See also ==
List of world's longest ships
