= Hanjin Heavy Industries and Construction Philippines =

South Korean shipbuilding company

- Industry: Shipbuilding
- Founded: February 2006; 19 years ago
- Headquarters: Olongapo, Zambales, Philippines
- Areas served: Worldwide
- Services: Shipbuilding
- Number of employees: 23,000 (2019)
- Parent: Hanjin Heavy Industries and Construction

Korean name
- Hangul: 한진필리핀
- Hanja: 韓進
- Revised Romanization: Hanjin Philippines
- McCune–Reischauer: Hanjin Philippines

Hanjin Heavy Industries and Construction Philippines, also known as HHIC Phil, was a Philippines-based shipbuilding company established in February 2006 by Hanjin Heavy Industries and Construction of South Korea. In the same month, its first shipbuilding contract was signed for four container ships. In May 2006, the construction of a shipyard began on Redondo Peninsula, on the western edge of Subic Bay.

The first vessel "Argolikos" was delivered in July 2008 for the Greek ship owner Dioryx. As of April 2011, the shipyard had delivered 20 ships. In 2013, the shipyard made its first oil tanker, and in 2016, it delivered its first gas carrier. The shipyard has also built parts of CALM buoys used for the Malampaya gas field offshore project. The shipyard also has two large dry docks.

In January 2019, the company filed for the largest bankruptcy in Philippine history with unpaid loan obligations amounting to US$412 million.

== Background ==
As part of its overseas expansion process in 2004, Hanjin Heavy Industries and Construction started building a shipyard on the Redondo peninsula, southwest of Subic, Zambales. According to the company's website, this resulted in the world's fourth-largest shipyard. As of September 2011, the shipyard employed 21,000 Filipinos.

On April 18, 2012, according to The New York Times, "a subsidiary of Huntington Ingalls Industries, a United States defense contractor, announced a deal to work with Hanjin Heavy Industries, which maintains a shipbuilding and repair facility at the former base at Subic Bay. That opens the door to large-scale servicing of United States military ships there for the first time in almost 20 years." Huntington Ingalls said in a news release that the companies "will work together in providing maintenance, repair and logistics services to the U.S. Navy and other customers in the Western Pacific region."

The company's workforce was expected to increase to nearly 28,000 in 2016. However, a slump in shipbuilding projects limited the workforce to 20,000 as of 2017.

As of September 2017, the company had the largest shipyard in the Philippines and was one of the largest private employers in the country.

== Shipyard ==
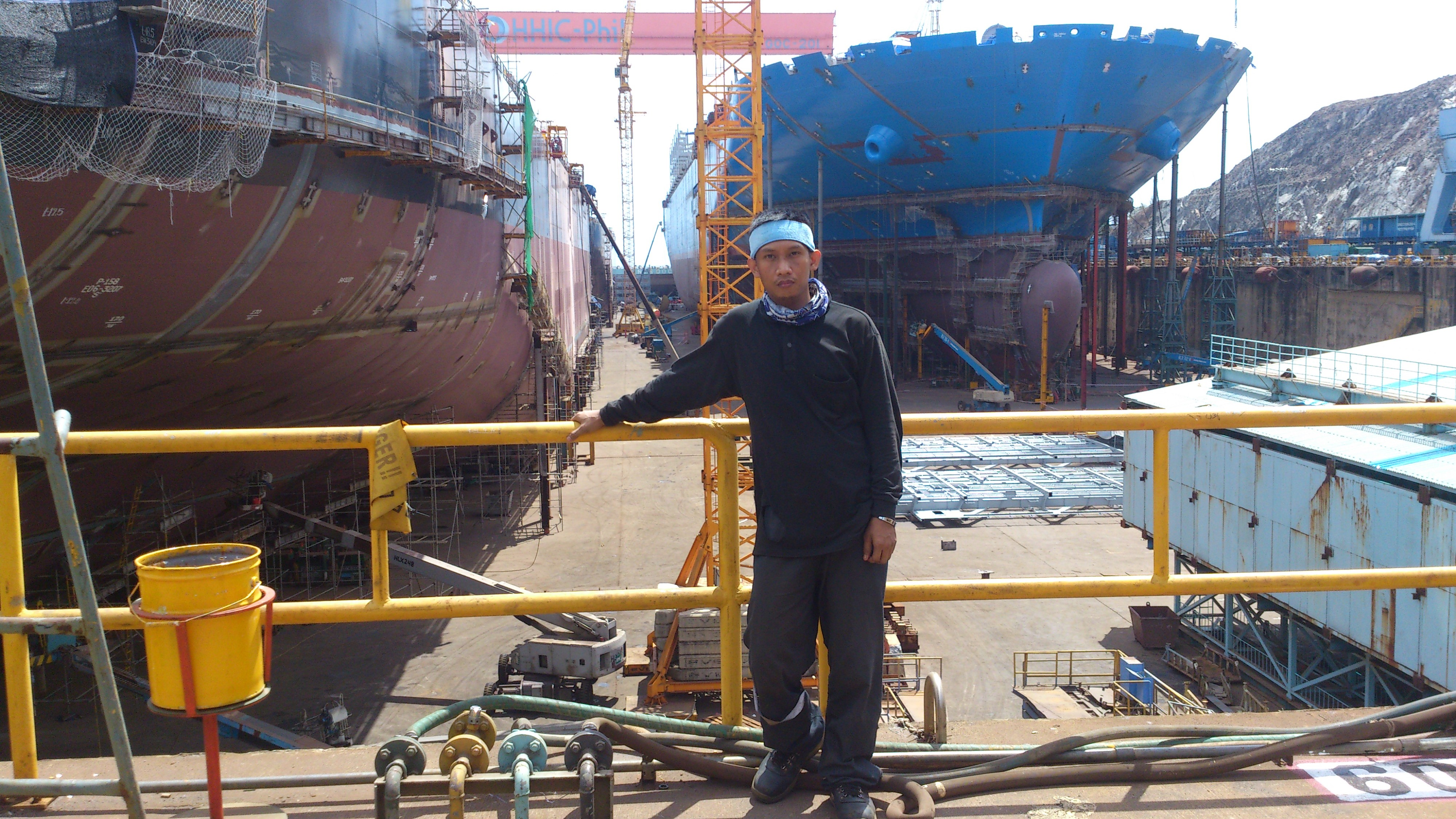
A 20.766 TEU container ship (CMA CGM Louis Bleriot) and oil tanker (Levantine Sea) being constructed at Dry Dock number 6

The shipyard is located on the eastern side of Redondo peninsula, in Agusuhin sitio, in Zambales province on Luzon. A large number of Koreans and Romanians who form the upper management of the shipyard live on site in barracks (colloquially called chicken coops). The shipyard occupies land owned by the Subic Bay Metropolitan Authority (SBMA) and was leased out to the company on a 40-year basis.

Jeepneys and buses hired by the company transport workers between the shipyard and the two nearby towns of Castillejos and Subic, with many workers staying farther out in Olongapo and San Marcelino. Most workers come to work at the company from other parts of the Philippines and stay in boarding houses in these towns. A large ferry and 25 charter buses transport its workers to and from Olongapo daily. Additionally, two smaller company-owned fast ferries transport a small number of the owners' representatives from Hanjin jetty near All Hands Beach, Subic Bay Freeport Zone to the shipyard. Security at the shipyard remains tight due to high pilferage by workers during its early years. The area is also strategically important to the Philippine Armed Forces, and is protected by both HHIC Police and Philippine Armed Forces commandos.

== Bankruptcy ==
On November 22, 2018, the company delivered two recently completed 114,000 deadweight ton crude oil tankers. However, with 20 vessels in different stages of construction at the time, the company found it difficult to service its high debts or to get further extensions from its lenders. On January 8, 2019, the company filed for corporate restructuring due to default or failure to comply with its loan obligation of $412 million to five Philippine banks, namely Rizal Commercial Banking Corporation, Land Bank, Metrobank, Bank of the Philippine Islands, and Banco de Oro. It became the biggest bankruptcy in the Philippines, surpassing the $386 million default by Lehman Brothers in the Philippines in 2008. As of January 2019, the five banks were working to take over the company's shipyard. On January 19, 2019, it was reported that two Chinese firms had filed expressions of interest to purchase the shipyard along with its debt. Subsequently, TradeWinds reported that HHIC Phil and the Philippine government had agreed upon a debt swap deal.

Australian shipbuilder Austal and US-based private equity firm Cerberus Capital Management considered launching a joint bid to take over the Subic shipyard. Austal would later drop its bid to have a stake in the shipyard.

Agila Subic became Cerberus' new partner, taking over the shipyard's operations in March 2022. Agila Subic is a Dutch venture consisting of four companies that are affiliates of Cerberus. Accordingly, the shipyard was renamed the Agila Subic Multi-Use Facilities.

The Philippine Navy began leasing the shipyard's northern section in May 2022. American defense contractor Vectrus also moved in.

Cerberus completed its acquisition of the shipyard by April 2022. In November 2022, SBMA officials welcomed United States Ambassador to the Philippines, MaryKay Carlson, and indicated they wanted to see American military forces return to the Philippine naval base.

== Labor ==
=== Nationalities employed ===
The shipyard's upper management consists of around 100 Koreans. The middle management staff includes Koreans, Romanians, and Filipinos. The foremen include Koreans, Filipinos, and Romanians, mostly employed by subsidiary companies of HHIC Phil operated by Filipinos. Most of the approximately 200 Romanian workers are employed in dock 5 and a few in dock 6 through the Romanian recruitment company Gateway Trading SRL. As of 2017 most of the workers, nearly 19,000, are Filipino. The shipyard provides free lunch, dinner and breakfast to all its workers in five large canteens.

=== Alleged labor violations ===
While the company's presence in Subic has brought thousands of jobs to the area, a steady stream of accidental workplace deaths and alleged labor violations have led to questions about the company's compliance with Philippine labor and occupational safety laws. During two months in 2008, five workers were killed in accidents that may have resulted from unsafe working conditions. This prompted investigations by the SBMA and the Philippine Congress, which found violations of safety and labor laws. After the Congressional inquiry, legislators required the company to build a medical center and comply with industrial safety laws within six months. Workers have since continued to express complaints of abuse by management; one such incident was caught on camera and distributed to the Filipino news station ABS-CBN. Many workers have also begun to organize to attain union recognition. According to organizers, who have started a blog to document abuses, 60 employees have been terminated for union-related activity, and over 30 have been killed in workplace accidents since the shipyard opened in 2006. Filipino church groups like the Caritas Filipinas Foundation have also rallied in support of the workers. HHIC Phil General Manager Pyeong Jong Yu has expressed commitment to preventing future incidents.

Since 2011, safety standards at the shipyard have improved, especially after ship owners introduced their own health and safety teams to augment the shipyard efforts.

== Ships built ==
The shipyard builds bulk carriers, container ships, and oil tankers. Additionally, it has undertaken offshore construction work such as building CALM buoys for the Malampaya gas field project.

=== Types of ships built ===
- Container ships – Capacity in TEUs: 3,600, 4,300 and 12,800
- Bulk carriers – Capacity 135,000 tonnes, 175,000 tonnes, 205,000 tonnes
- Very large crude carrier – Capacity 320,000 tonnes

=== Notable ships ===
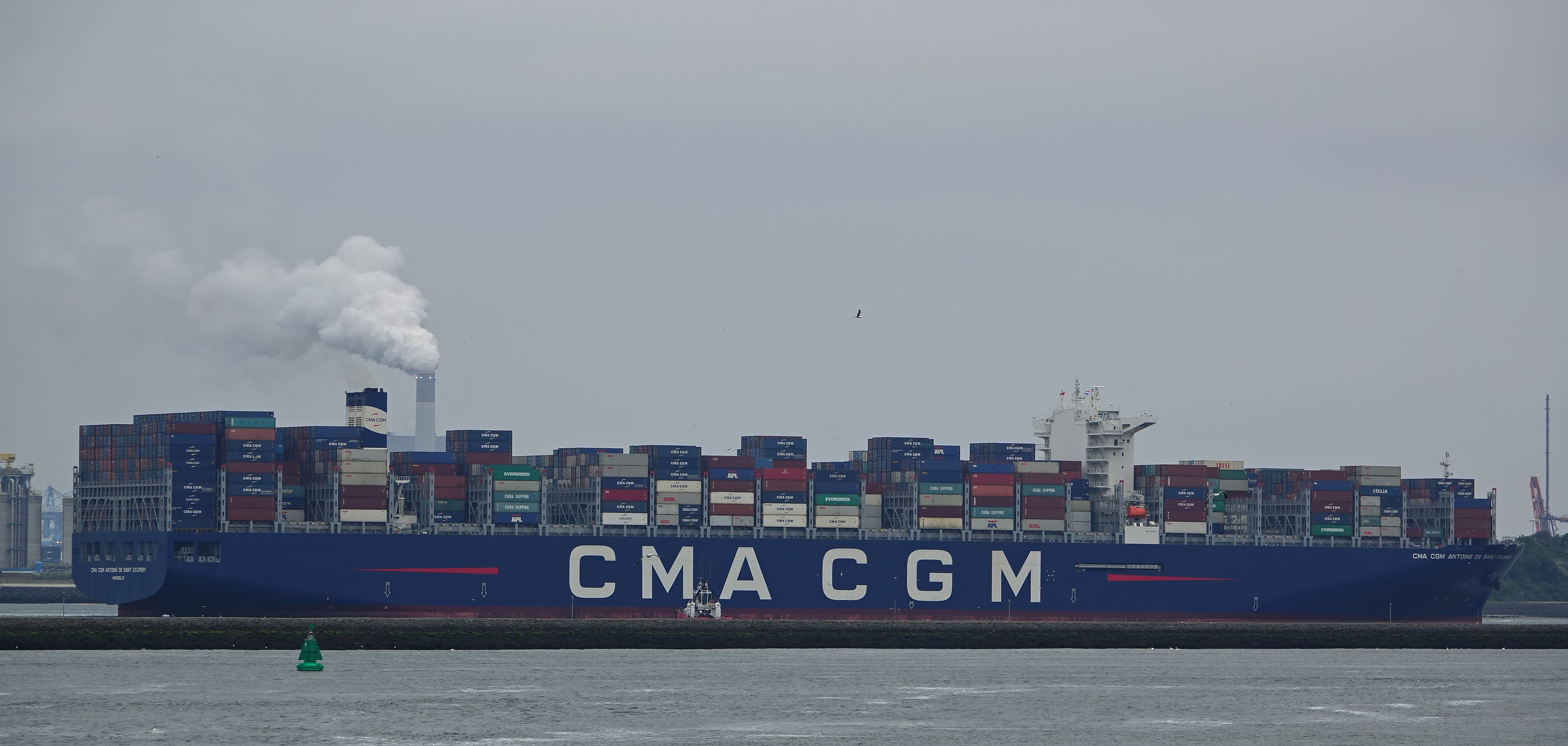
The CMA CGM Antoine de Saint Exupery

- M/V Argolikos – First container ship built in the Philippines, first ship built by the company
- M/T Leyla K – Largest oil tanker built in the Philippines as of October 2011
- CMA CGM Antoine de Saint Exupery (2018) – French container ship, owned by CMA CGM
