= MV Vale Rio de Janeiro =

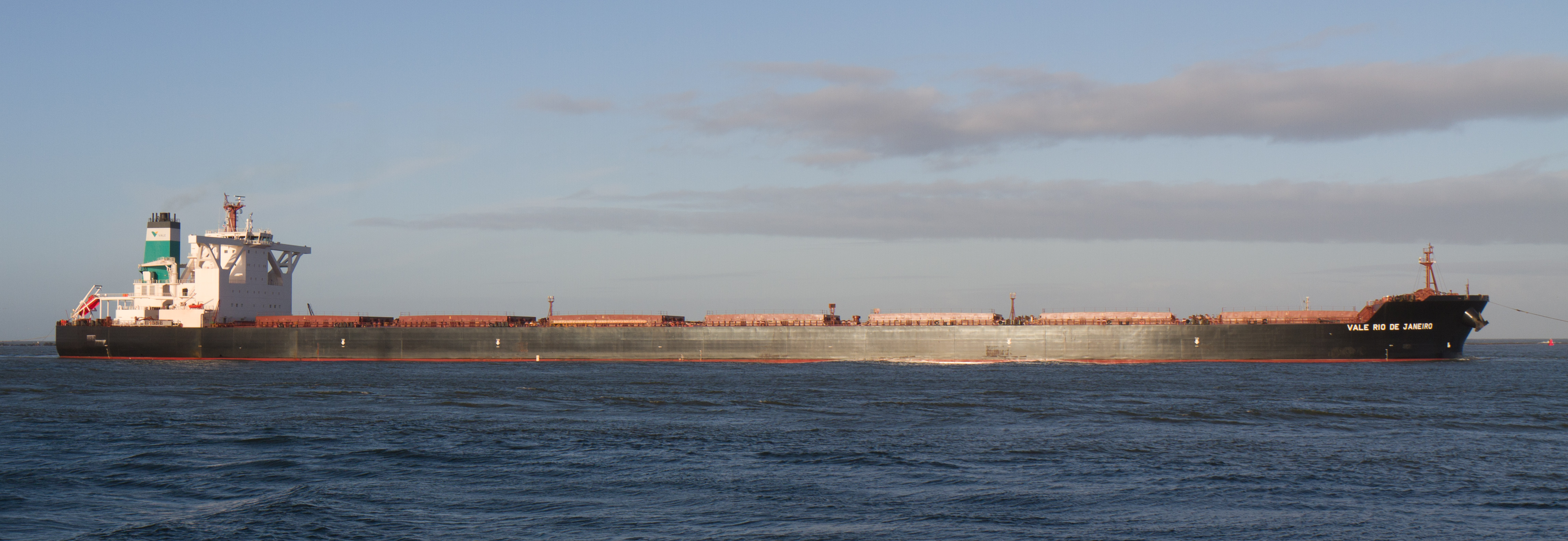
- Vale Rio de Janeiro entering Rotterdam Europoort

History
- Name: Vale Rio de Janeiro
- Namesake: Rio de Janeiro
- Owner: Vale Shipping Holding Pte. Ltd.
- Operator: Anglo Eastern Ship Management
- Port of registry: Hong Kong
- Route: Brazil to China
- Builder: Daewoo Shipbuilding & Marine Engineering Co., Ltd, South Korea
- Yard number: 1202
- Completed: September 2011
- In service: 2011–present
- Identification: IMO number: 9572329; MMSI number: 566173000; Call sign: 9V9128
- Status: In service

General characteristics
- Class & type: Valemax bulk carrier
- Tonnage: 198,980 GT; 67,993 NT; 402,347 DWT
- Length: 362.0 m (1,187 ft 8 in)
- Beam: 65.0 m (213 ft 3 in)
- Draught: 23.0 m (75 ft 6 in) (moulded)
- Depth: 30.4 m (99 ft 9 in)
- Installed power: MAN B&W 7S80ME-C8 (29,260 kW)
- Propulsion: Single shaft; fixed-pitch propeller
- Speed: 15.4 kn (28.5 km/h; 17.7 mph)
- Crew: 33

MV Vale Rio de Janeiro, owned by the Brazilian mining company Vale, is one of the world's largest very large ore carriers and a sister ship of Vale Brasil. Designed to carry iron ore from Brazil to Asia (primer market China) along the Cape route around South Africa, she is the second of seven 400,000-tonne very large ore carriers (VLOC) ordered by Vale from Daewoo Shipbuilding & Marine Engineering in South Korea and twelve from Jiangsu Rongsheng Heavy Industries in China. While close to the specifications of Chinamax, these ships are generally referred to as Valemax vessels by Vale.

== Design ==
The overall length of Vale Rio de Janeiro is 362.0 metres (1,187.7 ft), making her (with her sister ships) the largest bulk carrier(s) in the world. The breadth and depth of her hull are 65.0 metres (213.3 ft) and 30.4 metres (99.7 ft), respectively, giving her a gross tonnage of 198,980.

Vale Rio de Janeiro has seven cargo holds with a combined gross volume of 219,980 cubic metres and net tonnage of 67,993. Her deadweight tonnage is 402,347 tons. When carrying a full load of iron ore, equal to around 11,150 trucks, her draught is 23 metres (75.5 ft). Like other very large ore carriers of her size, Vale Brasil is limited to only a few deepwater ports in Brazil, Europe and China.

As of October 2011, Vale plans to set up a transhipment project off Subic bay. In addition to bringing in many more jobs for locals, this is expected to boost other industries in Subic bay, and put Philippines on the world map of Iron ore shipments. It is also expected to boost local industries like travel, hotels ship supplies and provisions.

Vale Rio de Janeiro is propelled by a single MAN B&W 7S80ME-C8 two-stroke low-speed diesel engine directly coupled to a fixed-pitch propeller. The main engine, which has a maximum output of 29,260 kilowatts (39,240 hp) at 78 rpm, burns 96.7 tons of heavy fuel oil per day. However, due to the large size of the vessel the emissions per cargo ton-mile are very low, making Vale Brasil in fact one of the most efficient long-distance dry bulk carriers in service, and for this reason the ship received the Clean Ship award of 2011 in the Norwegian shipping exhibition Nor-Shipping. Vale has reported 35 % drop in emissions per ton of cargo in comparison to older ships. Her service speed is 15.4 knots (28.5 km/h; 17.7 mph).

Vale Rio de Janeiro is classified by Det Norske Veritas with a class notation of 1A1 Ore Carrier ESP ES(O) E0 NAUT-OC BWM-E(s) IB-3 COAT-PSPC(B) CSA-2 BIS EL-2 TMON NAUTICUS(Newbuilding).

== Size record ==
The Vale Rio de Janeiro is considerably larger than the previous record-holder, Berge Stahl, in every respect. Both her gross tonnage and deadweight tonnage are larger than those of the Norwegian ship, 175,720 and 364,767 tons, respectively. While the draught of both ships is the same, the Vale Rio de Janeiro is also 20 metres (65.6 ft) longer and 1.5 metres (4.9 ft) wider than the Berge Stahl. In addition the Vale Rio de Janeiro is larger and slightly longer than the four new 388,000-ton, 361-metre (1,184 ft) Chinamax bulk carriers Berge Bulk has ordered from China Shipbuilding Industry Corporation. Had the Vale Rio de Janeiro not been built, these ships would have become the largest bulk carriers in the world.

She is also the second largest ship currently in service by deadweight tonnage, second only to the TI class supertankers that have a deadweight tonnage of over 440,000 tons.

== Career ==
The Vale Rio de Janeiro received her first cargo at the Brazilian port Terminal Marítimo de Ponta da Madeira in October 2011 with the intention of discharging in China, however, she was rerouted to Rotterdam. She arrived in Rotterdam on 8 January 2012. Although not confirmed by their owners it was rumored that there were problems in getting permission to enter Chinese ports with ships over 400,000 tons, even though many of the Valemax ships are actually built in China.

== 400,000 tonne controversy ==
The Valemax size ships, all ordered for Vale, have a deadweight of just over 400,000 tonnes and the Chinese government probably considers them too large to enter Chinese ports. Because of that the ships are now slimmed down to 380,000 tonnes deadweight, although it seems that this is only on paper: nothing has changed to the design but it would mean that ships to China cannot be loaded to capacity.

== See also ==
- MS Berge Stahl, the largest bulk carrier in the world before the Valemax.
- List of world's longest ships
