= Valemax =

Very large ore carrier

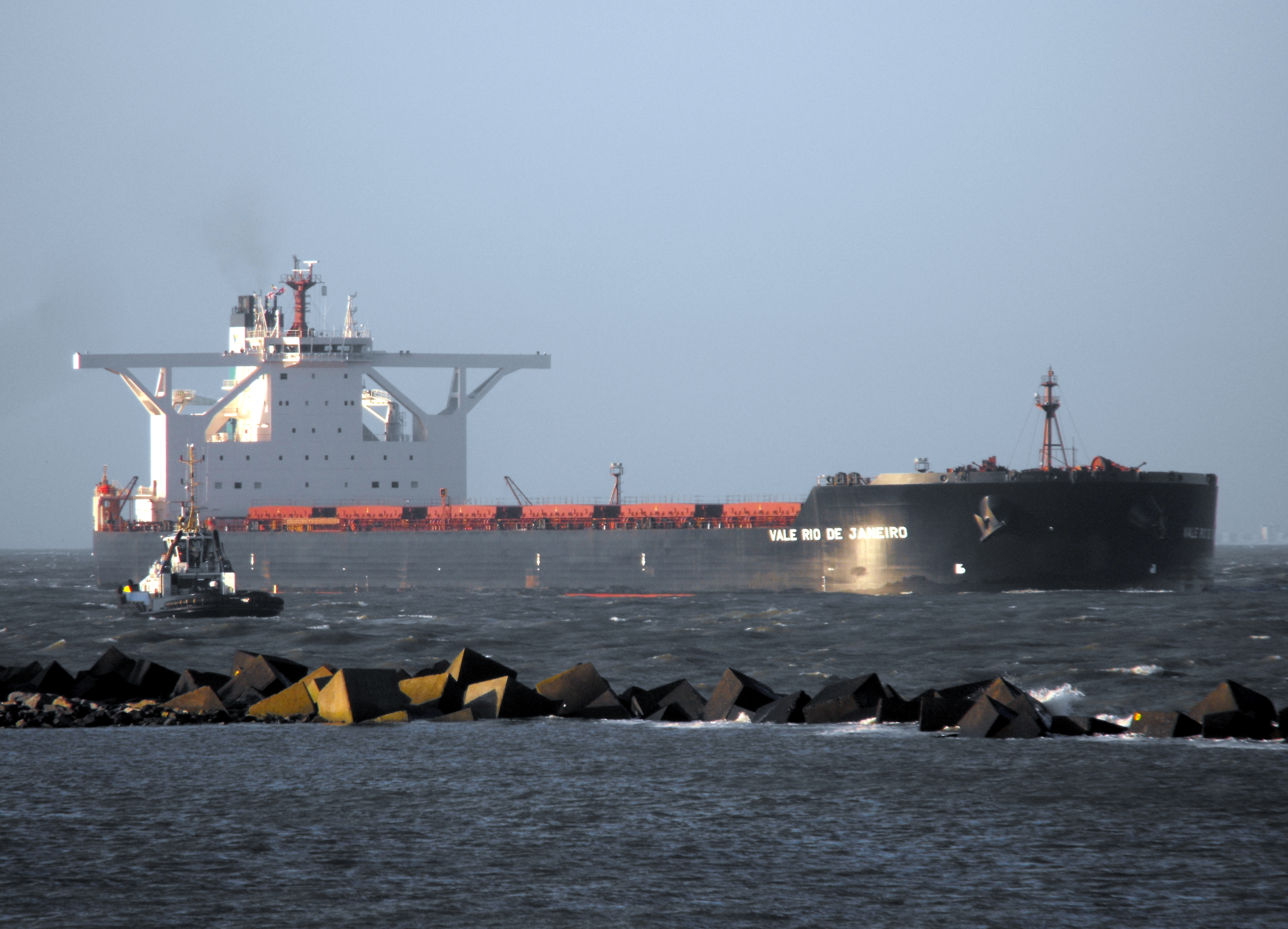
- Vale Rio de Janeiro arriving in Rotterdam in January 2012. Note fully laden hull, compared with photograph below.

Class overview
- Builders: Daewoo Shipbuilding & Marine Engineering, South Korea; Jiangsu Rongsheng Heavy Industries, China; STX Offshore & Shipbuilding (STX Jinhae), South Korea; STX Offshore & Shipbuilding (STX Dalian), China; Bohai Shipbuilding Heavy Industry, China; Shanhaiguan Shipbuilding, China; Shanghai Waigaoqiao Shipbuilding, China; Qingdao Beihai Shipbuilding, China; China Merchants Heavy Industry (Jiangsu), China; Yangzijiang Shipbuilding, China; Japan Marine United, Japan
- Operators: Vale Shipping (initial); Pan Ocean; Oman Shipping Company; Berge Bulk; Shandong Shipping; China Merchants Energy Shipping; China COSCO Bulk Shipping; Bank of Communications; NS United
- Built: 2011–2016 (first series); 2016–2020 (second series)
- In service: 2011–present
- Completed: 68 (list of ships)

General characteristics
- Type: Bulk carrier
- Tonnage: 380,000–400,000 DWT
- Length: 360–362 m (1,181–1,188 ft)
- Beam: 65 m (213 ft)
- Draught: 22–23 m (72–75 ft)
- Depth: 30 m (98 ft)
- Installed power: Low speed diesel engine (24,600 to 33,000 kW)
- Propulsion: Single shaft; fixed-pitch propeller
- Speed: 15 knots (28 km/h; 17 mph)

Valemax ships are a fleet of very large ore carriers (VLOC) owned or chartered by the Brazilian mining company Vale S.A. to carry iron ore from Brazil to European and Asian ports. With a capacity ranging from 380,000 to 400,000 tons deadweight, the vessels meet the Chinamax standard of ship measurements for limits on draft and beam. Valemax ships are the largest bulk carriers ever constructed, when measuring deadweight tonnage or length overall, and are amongst the longest ships of any type currently in service.

The first Valemax vessel, Vale Brasil, was delivered in 2011. Initially, all 35 ships of the first series were expected to be in service by 2013, but the last ship was not delivered until September 2016. In late 2015 and early 2016, Chinese shipping companies ordered 30 more ships with deliveries in 2018–2020. Three additional vessels were ordered by a Japanese shipping company, bringing the total number of Valemax vessels to 68 as of 2020.

== Construction ==
=== First series ===
In 2008, Vale placed orders for twelve 400,000-ton Valemax ships to be constructed by Jiangsu Rongsheng Heavy Industries (RSHI) in China and ordered seven more ships from South Korean Daewoo Shipbuilding & Marine Engineering (DSME) in 2009. In addition sixteen more ships of similar size were ordered from Chinese and South Korean shipyards for other shipping companies, and chartered to Vale under long-term contracts. The first vessel was delivered in 2011 and the last in 2016.

==== Jiangsu Rongsheng Heavy Industries ====
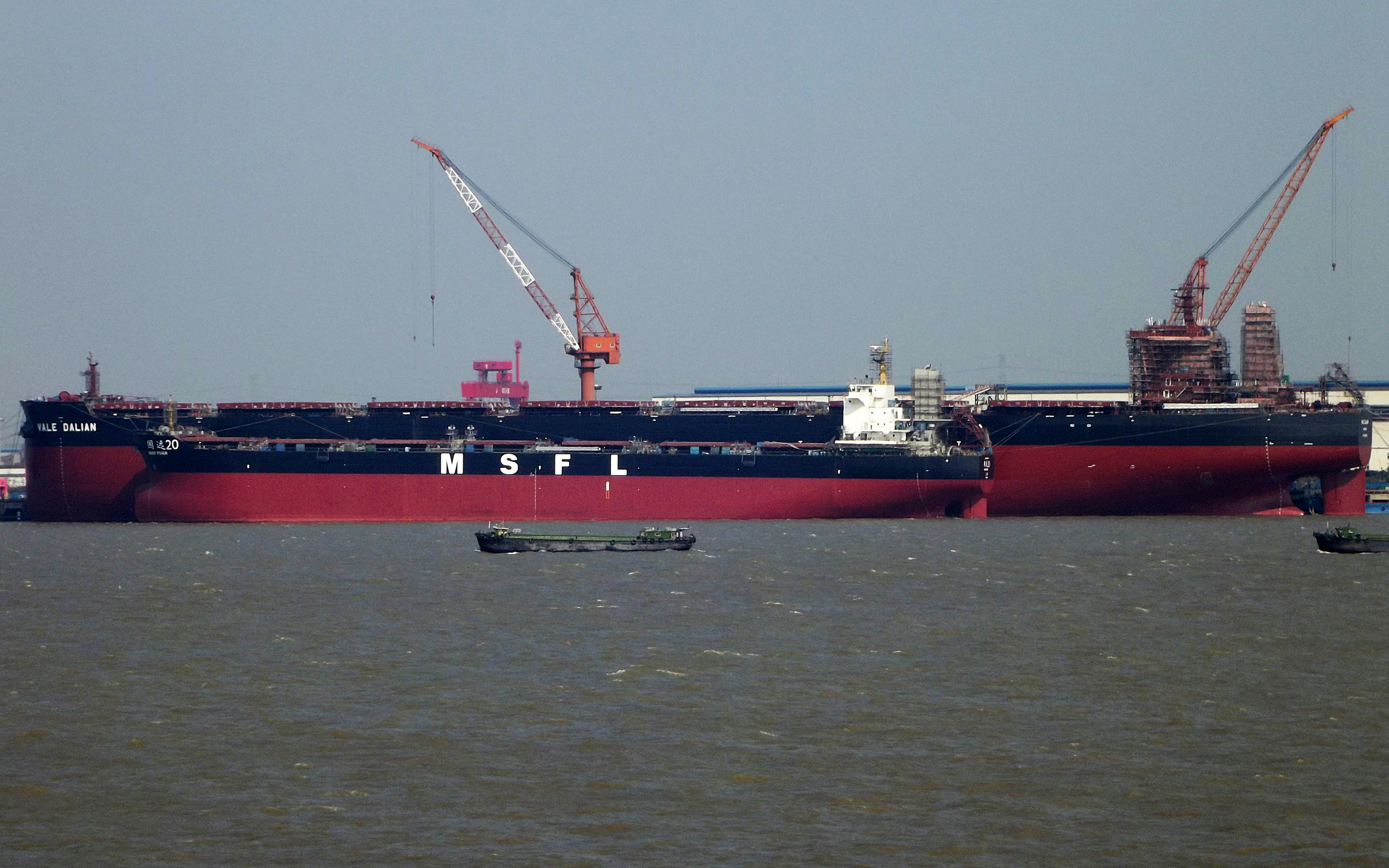
The 400,000-ton Vale Dalian photographed together with 75,750-ton Guo Yan 20, showing the size difference between a Valemax vessel and a Panamax bulk carrier. Note unladen hulls riding high in the water.

The first Valemax vessels were ordered on 3 August 2008 when Vale signed a contract with the Chinese shipbuilder Jiangsu Rongsheng Heavy Industries (RSHI) for the construction of twelve 400,000-ton ore carriers. The development had reportedly started in 2007. The contract, worth $1.6 billion, was the world's biggest single shipbuilding contract by deadweight tonnage.

The first Chinese-built Valemax vessel, Vale China, was launched at the Nantong shipyard on 9 July 2011 and delivered on 25 November 2011. Although it was expected that the first Chinese-built Valemax vessel would call a Chinese port on its maiden voyage, the ship was diverted to the new transshipment hub Vale had constructed in Philippines.

The second RSHI-built Valemax ship for Vale (Vale Dongjiakou) was delivered on 9 April 2012, the third (Vale Dalian) on 20 May, the fourth (Vale Hebei) on 28 September, the fifth (Vale Shandong) on 7 December 2012, the sixth (Vale Jiangsu) on 23 March 2013, the seventh (Vale Caofeidian) on 22 July 2013, the eighth (Vale Lianyungang) on 22 November 2013, the ninth (Ore Majishan; renamed before delivery) on 11 July 2014, the tenth (Ore Tianjin; renamed before delivery) on 18 October 2014, and the eleventh (Ore Rizhao; renamed before delivery) on 15 December 2014. The twelfth and last Valemax vessel of the original order by Vale, Ore Ningbo (renamed before delivery), was delivered on 23 January 2015.

On 2 November 2008, Oman Shipping Company signed a framework agreement with RSHI for the construction of four 400,000-ton vessels to transport iron ore from Brazil to the Port of Sohar in Oman, where Vale is expected to open a steel plant in near future. The shipbuilding contract, worth US$483 million, was signed in July 2009. Initially the ships were to be named Jazer, Yanqul, Al Kamil and Wafi, but instead they will be named Vale Liwa, Vale Sohar, Vale Shinas and Vale Saham. The steel cutting ceremony for the first two vessels was held on 8 July 2010 and they were launched on 19 March 2012. Vale Liwa entered service in August 2012, followed by Vale Sohar in September 2012, Vale Saham in January 2013, and Vale Shinas in March 2013. The ships reportedly received additional strengthening due to the Vale Beijing incident. The ships built for Oman Shipping Company were later removed from the Det Norske Veritas registry and moved to other classification societies such as American Bureau of Shipping and Lloyd's Register.

The Chinese shipbuilder's ability to deliver any of the very large ore carriers ordered by Vale in time was doubted already before the first ship was built. In May 2011, it was announced that only two or three Valemax vessels will be delivered from the Chinese shipyard in 2011 instead of the planned six due to delays in construction. In the end, only one ship (Vale China) was delivered before the end of the year. Furthermore, later reports claimed that the ships ordered by Vale had a capacity of only 380,000 tons even though according to the Det Norske Veritas database entries all Chinese-built ships have a deadweight tonnage in excess of 400,000 tons and in the past Vale has referred to the ships ordered from Rongsheng as "400,000-ton" vessels. The reduction in cargo capacity, at least on paper, may have been due to the reluctance of Chinese officials to accept the 400,000-ton ships to Chinese ports.

In April 2012, it was reported that Vale had refused delivery for three Valemax ships recently completed by Jiangsu Rongsheng Heavy Industries. This was seen as a move against the Chinese officials who have not allowed the 400,000-ton ships to dock in Chinese ports. However, the reports were rebutted by RSHI, who called them "inaccurate and unfounded".

==== Daewoo Shipbuilding & Marine Engineering ====
On 26 October 2009, Vale ordered four Valemax vessels from the South Korean shipbuilder Daewoo Shipbuilding & Marine Engineering (DSME) for $460 million. Further three ships were ordered from DSME in July 2010, bringing the total order to seven 400,000-ton Valemax vessels. Despite receiving the order later than the Chinese shipyard, DSME launched the first Valemax class ore carrier, Vale Brasil, on 31 December 2010 and delivered the ship to Vale in March 2011.

Vale Brasil was followed by Vale Rio de Janeiro on 22 September 2011, Vale Italia on 25 October 2011, Vale Malaysia on 27 March 2012, Vale Carajas on 29 May 2012, and Vale Minas Gerais on 13 July 2012. The last Valemax ship to be built by DSME, Vale Korea, was delivered on 9 April 2013.

==== STX Offshore & Shipbuilding ====
In addition to the ships Vale ordered for itself, more ships of similar size were to be built for other shipping companies and chartered to Vale under exclusive long-term contracts. Eight very large ore carriers were ordered from the South Korean shipbuilder STX Offshore & Shipbuilding in Jinhae, South Korea (STX Jinhae), and Dalian, China (STX Dalian). The shipping company, STX Pan Ocean, signed a 25-year contract with Vale in 2009. The deadweight tonnage of the Valemax vessels built by STX, 374,400 tons, is slightly smaller than that of the similar ships built by DSME and RSHI.

The first STX-built Valemax vessel, Vale Beijing, was delivered by STX Jinhae on 27 September 2011. Although another vessel was expected to take delivery later that year, only one ship was delivered. The second ship, Vale Qingdao, was delivered also by STX Jinhae on 13 April 2012, but the third and fourth ships, Vale Espirito Santo and Vale Indonesia, were built by STX Dalian and delivered on 17 September 2012 and 30 October 2012, respectively. The fifth ship, Vale Fujiyama, was again built by STX Jinhae and delivered on 26 November 2012. The sixth ship, Vale Tubarao, was delivered by STX Dalian on 30 January 2013. While both of the two remaining ships were supposed to be delivered by the end of 2013, only Vale Maranhao entered service on 29 August.

The last Valemax vessel to be built by STX, originally named Vale Ponta da Madeira but later referred to by its yard number "STX Dalian 1707", was launched sometime in 2015. However, the vessel was never finished and instead was listed as "for sale" in an unfinished state. In March 2016, it was reported that the last of the original 35 Valemax vessels to be built had been sold for just $16.8 million. Initially anonymous, the buyer was later identified as Pan Ocean (formerly STX Pan Ocean), the shipping company who originally ordered the vessel. The unfinished vessel was completed by the Chinese shipyard Shanhaiguan Shipbuilding and named Sea Ponta da Madeira.

==== Bohai Shipbuilding Heavy Industry ====
On 30 April 2007 Berge Bulk signed a contract with the Chinese shipbuilding company Bohai Shipbuilding Heavy Industry for the construction of four 388,000-ton very large ore carriers. Although initially scheduled for delivery in 2010, the first vessel, Berge Everest, was delivered on 23 September 2011. It was followed by Berge Aconcagua on 15 March 2012 and Berge Jaya on 12 June 2012. The remaining ship, Berge Neblina, was initially also scheduled to be delivered in 2012, but entered service on 4 January 2013.

Had Vale not ordered the Valemax fleet in 2008, these ships would have become the largest bulk carriers in the world, surpassing Berge Bulk's own Berge Stahl. The four ships have since been chartered by Vale and, despite slight differences in design and contract date predating that of the ships ordered by Vale, they are also referred to as Valemax vessels.

=== Second series ===
In March 2016, it was reported that three Chinese companies, China Ocean Shipping (Group) Company (COSCO), China Merchants Energy Shipping and Industrial and Commercial Bank of China (ICBC), had ordered ten Valemax vessels each from four Chinese shipyards with a total price of US$2.5 billion. The Valemax ships ordered by China Merchants Energy Shipping would be built by Shanghai Waigaoqiao Shipbuilding (4 ships), Qingdao Beihai Shipbuilding (4 ships), and China Merchants Group-controlled China Merchants Heavy Industry (Jiangsu) (2 ships). China COSCO Shipping Corporation awarded the construction of all of its ten 400,000-ton ore carriers to Shanghai Waigaoqiao Shipbuilding. ICBC, which would later hand over the vessels to China Marchants Energy Shipping, announced that six of its ships would be built by the Chinese privately owned shipyard Yangzijian Shipbuilding while the remaining four would be awarded to Qingdao Beihai Shipbuilding. The first of the thirty Chinese-built second-generation Valemax vessels, Yuan He Hai, was delivered on 11 January 2018 and the last one of the series, Yuan Qian Hai, in January 2020.

In December 2016, the Japanese shipping company NS United ordered a single 400,000 DWT very large ore carrier from Japan Marine United after signing a 25-year contract with Vale. The vessel, which would become the first Valemax ship built in Japan, was delivered in December 2019 as NSU Carajas. A second vessel (NSU Brazil), was ordered in June 2017 and a third (NSU Tubarao) later that year; both were delivered in late 2020.

== Career ==
=== Initial career and ban ===
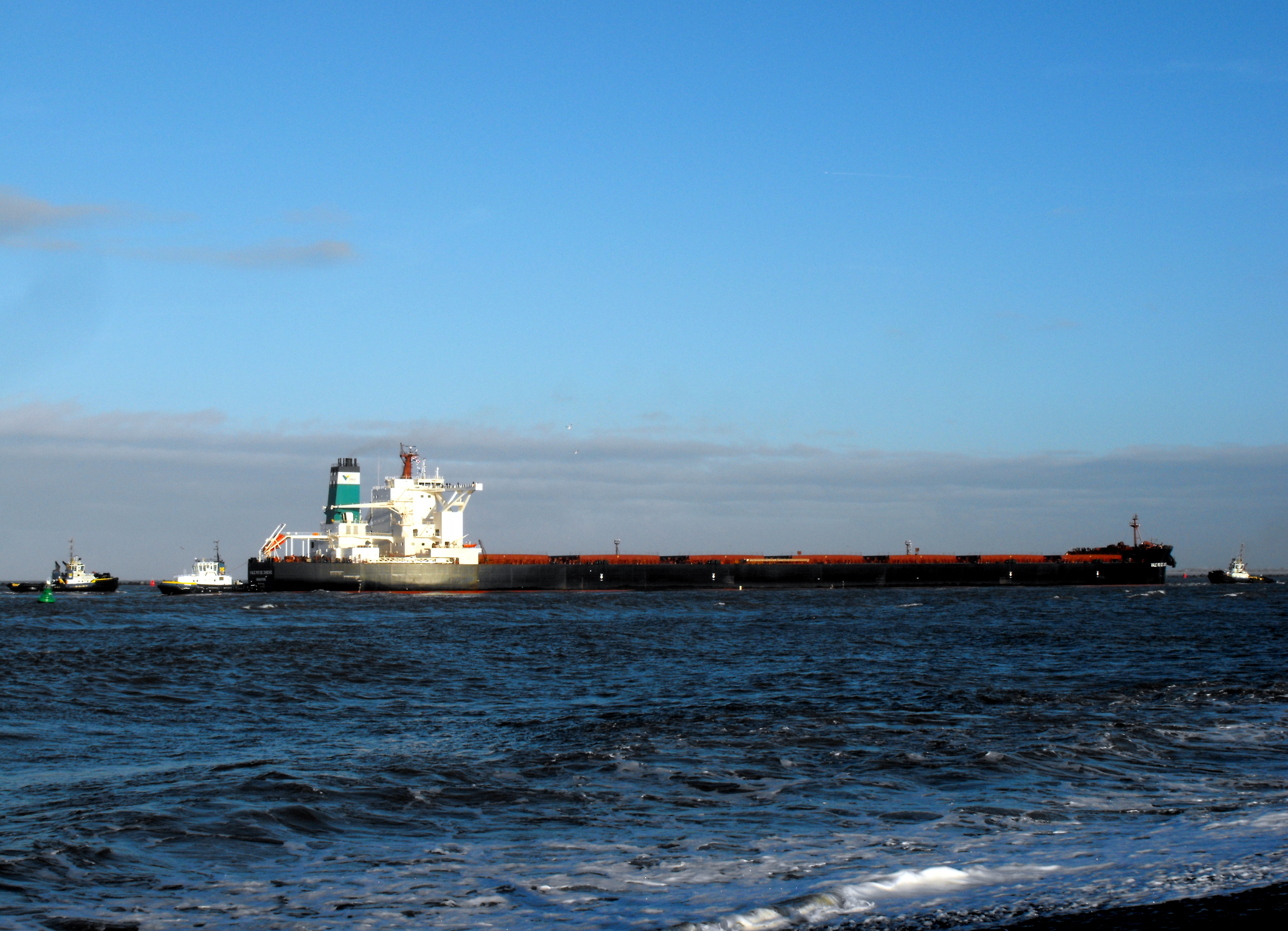
Vale Rio de Janeiro arriving at Rotterdam, January 2012.

On 24 May 2011, Vale Brasil received her first cargo at the Brazilian port Terminal Marítimo de Ponta da Madeira, 391,000 tons of iron ore bound for Dalian in China. However, the ship turned back towards the Atlantic Ocean in June after rounding the Cape of Good Hope and was rerouted to Taranto, Italy. There had been speculation that Vale Brasil was not allowed to enter the Chinese port fully laden, but according to Vale the destination was changed due to commercial, not political reasons. The ship arrived at the port of Taranto on 14 July 2011 to discharge her cargo. Since then, fully laden Valemax vessels have unloaded at various ports, such as Dalian in China, Sohar in Oman, Rotterdam in the Netherlands, Ōita in Japan, Dangjin in South Korea, and the transshipment hub Vale has constructed at Subic Bay in the Philippines.

On 31 January 2012, the Ministry of Commerce of the People's Republic of China officially banned dry bulk carriers with capacity exceeding 300,000 tons from entering Chinese ports in order to protect the domestic freight industry. Prior to this, only one of the new very large ore carrier chartered by Vale, Berge Everest, had unloaded Brazilian iron ore at a Chinese port – the ship arrived at Dalian on 28 December 2011 – but this was assumed to be a bureaucratic fluke as no Chinese port has regulatory approval to receive dry bulk carriers of that size.

According to Vale, the discussions about allowing the Valemax ships to enter Chinese ports were ongoing since the ban came into force and the Chinese officials had given a preliminary go-ahead for the construction of new berths capable of accommodating the 400,000-ton ships. According to the Ningbo Port Company, the construction of the new port facilities would take two to three years, causing further delays for Vale, which in the meantime was losing $2–3 per ton of ore due to the ban. On 15 April 2013, Vale Malaysia became the first 400,000-ton Valemax vessel to call a Chinese port. The partially loaded ship docked at the port of Lianyungang en route from the Vale transshipment hub in Subic Bay, Philippines. However, at the time, the Chinese officials had not yet lifted the ban for fully laden Valemax vessels. The first fully laden Valemax vessel to call a Chinese port since 2012, Shandong Da Ren, docked at the Dongjiakou port in Qingdao on 2 October 2014. The ban was officially lifted in July 2015.

=== Sale of ships ===
Originally, Vale planned to own and manage a fleet of 19 Valemax vessels by itself in order to control the wildly fluctuating charter prices for large bulk carriers which had dropped from US$233,988 per day in June 2008 to as low as US$2,400 by December of the same year. However, because of the Great Recession and Chinese ports' reluctance to accept the fully laden ships, the new board of directors decided to focus capital allocation on mining. As a result, Vale decided to sell the ships and charter them back under long-term contracts. Although Vale was expected to suffer financial losses from selling the ships, they would have been covered by the profit from iron ore sales even at depressed ore prices if only one or two full shipments could be unloaded in Chinese ports.

In September 2014, Vale signed a framework agreement with the state-owned China Ocean Shipping (Group) Company (COSCO), establishing a strategic cooperation in iron ore shipping. Later that month, a 25-year freight contract was signed between Vale and China Merchants Group. As part of the agreement, the Chinese shipping company will construct 10 new very large ore carriers to transport iron ore from Brazil to China. Following these agreements, China's ban on Valemax vessels has been effectively lifted, allowing fully laden ships to enter Chinese ports.

In May 2015, four ships were sold to China Ore Shipping Pte. Ltd., a joint venture between COSCO and China Shipping Development Company, for US$445 million. These were the first Valemax vessels to officially change ownership. Later, four more ships were sold to China Merchants Energy Shipping. In December 2015, Vale announced that the remaining 11 Valemax ships owned by the mining company would be sold and leased back from the new owners. The last Valemax vessels were reportedly sold in December 2017.

=== Incidents ===
==== Structural failure of Vale Beijing ====
On 5 December 2011, it was reported that Vale Beijing, operated by STX Pan Ocean, had suffered structural damage during her first cargo loading and was in danger of sinking at the port of Ponta da Madeira in Brazil due to seawater entering ruptured ballast tanks and cargo holds. The South Korean-built Valemax ship, partially loaded with 260,000 tons of iron ore, was towed away from Pier 1 by tugboats in the following day, and as a precaution against environmental damage, the Brazilian authorities requested her fuel tanks to be emptied. Because there are no facilities to unload iron ore from the ship at Ponta da Madeira and no large shipyards in the region, emergency repairs had to be performed by divers and the cargo redistributed while the ship was anchored offshore before it could be towed to a shipyard.

The cause of the damage has not been published by STX, but design or construction flaws, material fatigue, and incorrect loading have all been suspected. According to calculations performed by DNV, the damage was not caused by global strength issues or single pass loading, but is assumed to be related to local buckling strength in some areas of the web frames in the aft ballast tanks. Vale Beijing remained anchored off Ponta da Madeira with a crawler crane on the deck and an oceangoing tug standing by until 19 February 2012, when it left São Luís for Oman. After unloading at Sohar, the ship headed to South Korea for dry docking and arrived at STX shipyard in Jinhae, where it was delivered in September 2011, for inspection and repairs on 21 April 2012. Vale Beijing returned to service in July 2012.

Had Vale Beijing sunk at the pier instead of being moved to an anchorage area outside the port shortly after the leak was detected, the incident would have severely delayed the operations at the port, which ships out about 10 percent of the world's iron ore production. On 11 November 1994, while Vale Beijing delayed the loading of only 750,000 tons of iron ore, Trade Daring, a 145,000 DWT ore-bulk-oil carrier, broke in two at the same location due to incorrect loading, blocking the deepwater pier of Ponta da Madeira for more than six weeks before the wreck was removed and scuttled offshore.

After the incident, the China Shipowners' Association (CSA) questioned the safety of the 400,000-ton ore carriers commissioned by Vale. CSA was particularly concerned about the ability of the newly built ships to withstand various sea conditions and the pollution resulting from fuel oil leaks in case of structural damage — each Valemax ship can carry around 10,000 tons of fuel oil. In January 2012, China officially banned the vessels from Chinese ports. However, in April 2013, the China Shipping Association confirmed that the first Valemax vessel was allowed to dock in the Chinese port of Lianyungang in Jiangsu province. The ban was officially lifted in July 2015 as China's transport ministry and National Development and Reform Commission announced that four ports would be opened up for 400,000-ton vessels.

==== Grounding of Vale Indonesia ====
On 7 September 2013, Vale Indonesia ran aground on a sandbar about 40 nautical miles (74 km; 46 mi) north of São Luís. The vessel, operated by STX Pan Ocean, was fully laden with 390,000 tons of iron ore bound for Vale's transhipment hub in Subic Bay. Two ballast tanks were reportedly breached, but there were no injuries or pollution, and the vessel was not in danger of sinking.

==== Allision of NSU Carajas ====
On 28 November 2020, arriving at Ponta da Madeira terminal in Brazil, NSU Carajas allided with two Liberian-flagged 179,000 DWT bulk carriers, Star Janni and Korona D, already berthed there. While there were no injuries among the crews or the terminal personnel, the ships suffered structural damage and were subsequently moved to an anchorage area outside of the port for inspection.

== Naming ==
All Valemax vessels, with the exception of those owned and operated by Berge Bulk, were initially given names consisting of the word Vale and a place name, either one related to the mining operations of Vale S.A. in Brazil or a potential destination for the new iron ore carriers. However, none of the original 35 Valemax vessels retains its original name.

When Vale signed a $500 million contract with the Chinese shipping company Shandong Shipping for the operation of four Valemax vessels, the ships were given new names beginning with Shandong. Similarly, when four Valemax vessels were sold to China Ore Shipping, the vessels were given names beginning with Yuan and ending with Hai. Four more Valemax vessels were given names starting with Pacific after Vale sold the ships to China Merchants Energy Shipping.

Additionally, numerous Valemax vessels have been renamed by replacing Vale with Ore or Sea but retaining the second part of the name. Vale Sohar, Vale Saham, Vale Liwa and Vale Shinas have also been renamed Sohar Max, Saham Max, Liwa Max and Shinas Max, respectively.

== Design ==
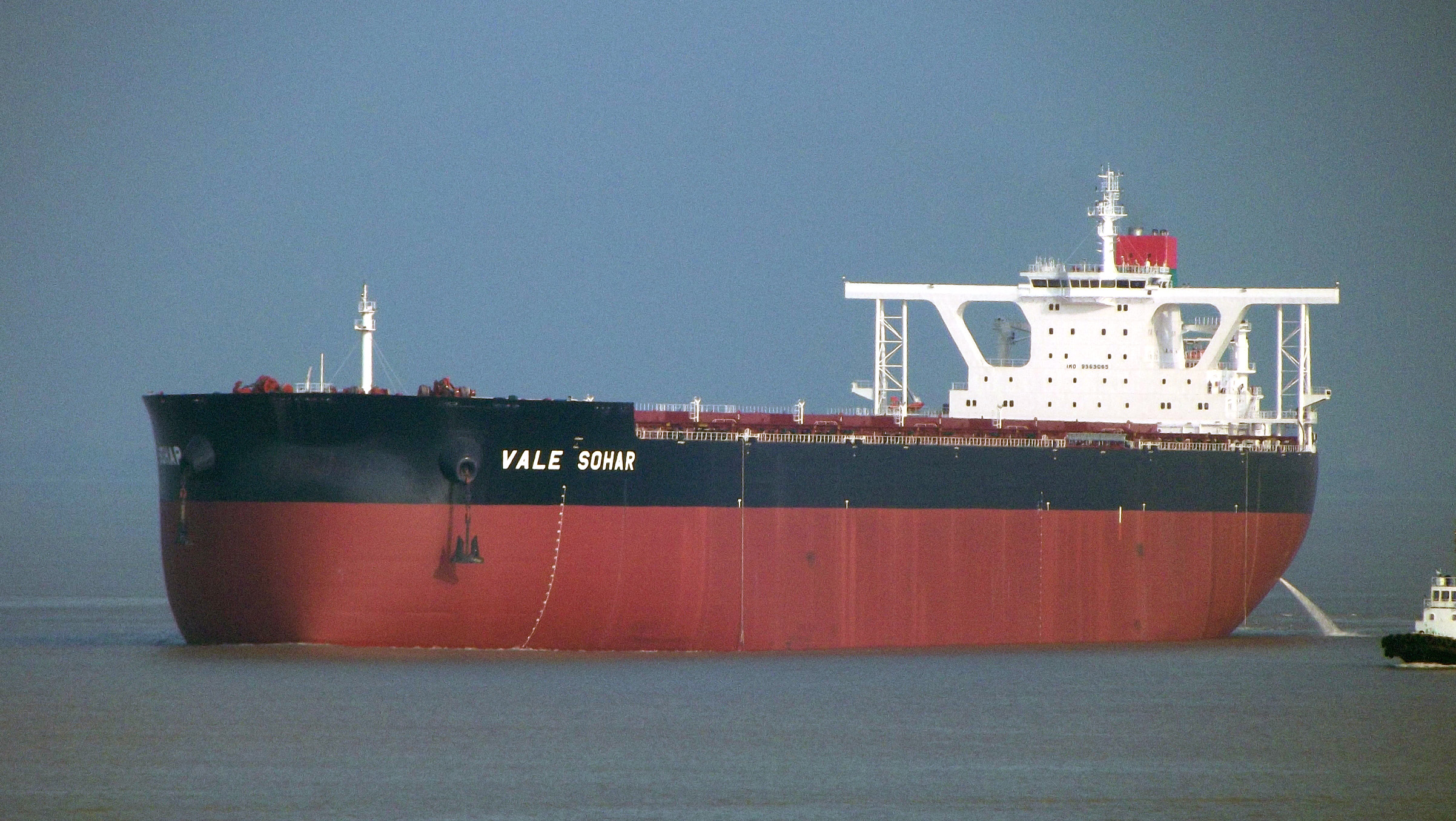
Vale Sohar, built by Jiangsu Rongsheng Heavy Industries (RSHI), awaiting delivery to Oman Shipping Company in Nantong, China, in September 2012. Note the minor differences from the South Korean-built Vale Rio de Janeiro.

=== General characteristics ===
Although similar in size, there are some differences in main dimensions, cargo capacity, machinery and external appearance between the Valemax ships built in South Korea, China and Japan. While the first series of 35 ships was more diverse, all 30 Chinese-built Valemax vessels of the second series are based on the same standard design, SDARI 400OC, by Shanghai Merchant Ship Design & Research Institute (SDARI). The three Japanese-built vessels, however, represent another standard design, G400OC.

Valemax ships are 360 to 362 metres (1,181 to 1,188 ft) long, making them some of the longest ships currently in service. With a maximum draught of between 22 and 23 metres (72 and 75 ft) while loaded, the ships are limited only to a few deepwater ports in Brazil, Europe and China. In ballast, the ships draw around 12 metres (39 ft) of water. The breadth of the Valemax ships is about 65 metres (213 ft). The size of the ships is limited mainly by Chinese ports, and the ships of this size are generally referred to as Chinamax vessels.

The largest bulk carriers ever built, the Valemax vessels have seven cargo holds with a total gross volume of almost 220,000 cubic metres (287,749 cu yd). In addition to increasing the strength of the hull, special attention has also been paid to improving the speed and efficiency of the loading and discharging operations. Each cargo hold can be fully loaded by a shiploader in a single step with a loading rate of 13,500 tonnes per hour and can carry almost as much iron ore as a small Panamax carrier. In addition, the space inside the cargo hold that cannot be reached by grabs during discharging, the so-called "dead spots", is minimized. With a deadweight tonnage of about 400,000 tons, a fully laden Valemax vessel is carrying as much iron ore as around 11,150 trucks, enough to produce steel for three Golden Gate bridges. The first 35 Valemax ships were said to be capable of carrying about 15% of the annual iron ore exports from Brazil to all destinations if each ship does four round trips per year.

Like most modern bulk carriers, Valemax vessels are powered by a single two-stroke low-speed crosshead diesel engine directly coupled to a fixed-pitch propeller. The ships built by DSME and STX in South Korea are powered by 7-cylinder MAN B&W 7S80ME-C8 and 7S80ME-C engines, respectively, and the ships built by RSHI and Bohai Shipbuilding Heavy Industry have Wärtsilä 7RT-flex82T and 7RT-flex84T engines, respectively. Both MAN and Wärtsilä engines will have a maximum continuous rating of around 29,000 kW (39,000 hp) when turning the 10-metre (33 ft) propeller at 76–78 rpm, giving the ships a service speed of around 15 knots (28 km/h; 17 mph) while burning almost 100 tons of heavy fuel oil per day. However, because of the vessels' large size, emissions per cargo ton-mile are very low; thus the Valemax vessels are in fact among the most efficient long-distance dry bulk carriers in service – Vale has reported a 35% drop in emissions per ton of cargo carried in comparison to older ships. In the second series, the main engine has been changed to a more efficient MAN B&W 7G80ME-C9 engine producing about 33,000 kW (44,000 hp) at 72 rpm, while claiming a further 15% to 20% reduction in carbon dioxide emissions. The Japanese-built ships have 7RT-flex82T engines rated at 24,600 kW (33,000 hp) and 74 rpm, slightly less than their South Korean- or Chinese-built equivalents.

=== Size record ===
Vale Brasil compared to other recent record-holder ships.

The new ships are considerably larger than the previous record holder, 364,767-ton Berge Stahl, which had been the largest bulk carrier in the world since it was built in 1986. While the draft of the old vessel is the same as that of the Valemax vessels — 23 metres (75 ft) — the new ships are 20 metres (66 ft) longer and 1.5 metres (4.9 ft) wider than the old freighter, and can carry about 10% more cargo.

The Valemax vessels are also the second largest ships in service by deadweight tonnage, second only to the TI-class supertankers that have a deadweight tonnage of over 440,000 tons. They are still far from the largest ship ever constructed — Seawise Giant (labeled as the Knock Nevis in the adjacent image), built in 1979 and broken up in 2009, was 458.46 metres (1,504.1 ft) long and had a deadweight tonnage of 564,650 tons — and also considerably longer than the longest ship currently in service, the 400-metre (1,312 ft) container ship Barzan.

== Criticism ==
Vale's decision to construct a fleet of 400,000-ton ore carriers was widely criticized by other shipping companies. The new Valemax ships, expected to cut the company's transportation costs by 20–25%, were blamed for driving down the freight rates for the entire industry, swelling the already oversupplied bulk transportation market and stalling the recovery of the shipping business after the Great Recession. The freight rates, down 80% from 2008, were expected to drop further down to the levels of 1977. According to the chief executive of the Baltic and International Maritime Council, Valemax vessels could displace up to 168 150,000–180,000-ton capesize bulk carriers, around 15% of the existing fleet, from the long-haul voyages and force them to less profitable shorter routes. Vale responded to the criticism by stating that the company aims to permanently cut the costs of Atlantic-Pacific dry bulk shipping to make Brazilian ore more competitive against iron ore produced in Australia, which is closer to major customers in Asia.

Vale also faced opposition from the China Shipowners' Association, which claimed that the Brazilian mining company is seeking to control the freight market as it has already done with the iron ore prices. In the past, the Chinese ports were not allowed to increase their capacity to more than 300,000 tons for dry bulk carriers due to safety and environmental concerns. If the 400,000-ton Valemax vessels are allowed to Chinese ports, Vale's monopoly on the route may result in losses for other shipping companies operating capesize ore carriers. When Vale Brasil was diverted to Italy on her maiden voyage, there was speculation that the domestic steel industry of China had urged the authorities to protect their commercial interests. However, Vale has also received support from the Chinese steel companies as they would benefit from lower transportation costs.

As a precaution against a prolonged ban on Valemax vessels from the Chinese ports, Vale started constructing both land- and offshore-based transshipment hubs where iron ore can be loaded to smaller ships for final delivery. Ore Fabrica, a 280,000 DWT crude oil tanker converted in China, arrived at Subic Bay, Philippines, in late January 2012. A second transshipment vessel, Ore Sossego, entered service in 2013. This backup plan was criticized by the vice-executive chairman of the CSA, Zhang Shouguo, who called it "waste of resource" and questioned Vale's ability to run the fleet as properly as professional shipping companies. The transshipment operations ended in 2017, and both Ore Fabrica and Ore Sossego were sold for scrap.

In May 2012, the largest Chinese operator of dry bulk carriers, state-owned China Ocean Shipping (Group) Company (COSCO), claimed that Vale had refused to use the company's ships since March as a protest against banning the Valemax vessels from Chinese ports. Vale has refused to give comments on the issue.

Luiz Inácio Lula da Silva, the former president of Brazil, also publicly criticized Vale's former CEO Roger Agnelli for the decision to purchase ships from Asian shipyards instead of building them in Brazil, especially since da Silva has been trying to revitalize the country's shipbuilding industry to foster job growth and increase local demand for steel and other products. Agnelli, who later left his position following continued criticism, replied that the Brazilian shipyards lacked the capacity to build such ships and stated that during the past few years Vale had commissioned 51 vessels from Brazilian shipyards.

== List of Valemax vessels ==
=== First series ===
Current name	Previous names	Owner/operator	Year built	Yard number	IMO number	Status	Ref
Daewoo Shipbuilding & Marine Engineering
Ore Brasil	Vale Brasil (2011–2014)	China Merchants Energy Shipping	2011	1201	9488918	In service	
Shandong Da De	Vale Rio de Janeiro (2011–2013)	Bank of Communications	2011	1202	9572329	In service	
Ore Italia	Vale Italia (2011–2014)	China Merchants Energy Shipping	2011	1203	9572331	In service	
Shandong Da Ren	Vale Malaysia (2012–2014)	Bank of Communications	2012	1204	9572343	In service	
Shandong Da Cheng	Vale Carajas (2012–2014)	Bank of Communications	2012	1212	9593919	In service	
Shandong Da Zhi	Vale Minas Gerais (2012–2013)	Shandong Shipping Corporation	2012	1213	9593957	In service	
Ore Korea	Vale Korea (2013–2014)	China Merchants Energy Shipping	2013	1214	9593969	In service	
STX Offshore & Shipbuilding
Sea Beijing	Vale Beijing (2011–2014)	Pan Ocean	2011	1701	9575448	In service	
Sea Qingdao	Vale Qingdao (2012–2014)	Pan Ocean	2012	1702	9575450	In service	
Sea Espirito Santo	Vale Espirito Santo (2012–2014)	Pan Ocean	2012	1703	9575462	In service	
Sea Indonesia	Vale Indonesia (2012–2014)	Pan Ocean	2012	1704	9575474	In service	
Sea Fujiyama	Vale Fujiyama (2012–2014)	Pan Ocean	2012	1705	9575486	In service	
Sea Tubarao	Vale Tubarao (2013–2014)	Pan Ocean	2013	1706	9575498	In service	
Sea Ponta da Madeira	Vale Ponta da Madeira (Note: Never officially named); STX Dalian 1707 (Note: While construction was stopped)	Pan Ocean	2016 (Note: Completed by Shanhaiguan Shipbuilding)	1707	9575503	In service	
Sea Maranhao	Vale Maranhao (2013–2014)	Pan Ocean	2013	1708	9575515	In service	
Jiangsu Rongsheng Heavy Industries
Ore China	Vale China (2011–2014)	China Merchants Energy Shipping	2011	H1105	9522972	In service	
Ore Dongjiakou	Vale Dongjiakou (2012–2014)	China Merchants Energy Shipping	2012	H1106	9532513	In service	
Pacific Warrior	Vale Dalian (2012–2014); Ore Dalian (2014–2015)	China Merchants Energy Shipping	2012	H1107	9532525	In service	
Ore Hebei	Vale Hebei (2012–2014)	China Merchants Energy Shipping	2012	H1108	9532537	In service	
Ore Shandong	Vale Shandong (2012–2014)	China Merchants Energy Shipping	2012	H1109	9532549	In service	
Yuan Zhen Hai	Vale Jiangsu (2013–2014); Ore Jiangsu (2014–2015)	China COSCO Bulk Shipping	2013	H1110	9532551	In service	
Yuan Shi Hai	Vale Caofeidian (2013–2014); Ore Caofeidian (2014–2015)	China COSCO Bulk Shipping	2013	H1111	9532575	In service	
Yuan Jian Hai	Vale Lianyungang (2013–2015)	China COSCO Bulk Shipping	2013	H1112	9532587	In service	
Yuan Zhuo Hai	Vale Majishan (Note: As launched; renamed before delivery); Ore Majishan (2014–2015)	China COSCO Bulk Shipping	2014	H1113	9532599	In service	
Pacific Merchants	Vale Tianjin; Ore Tianjin (2014–2015)	China Merchants Energy Shipping	2014	H1114	9532604	In service	
Pacific Winner	Vale Rizhao; Ore Rizhao (2014–2015)	China Merchants Energy Shipping	2014	H1115	9532616	In service	
Pacific Mariner	Vale Ningbo; Ore Ningbo (2015)	China Merchants Energy Shipping	2015	H1116	9532628	In service	
Sohar Max	Vale Sohar (2012–2014)	Oman Shipping Company	2012	H1125	9565065	In service	
Liwa Max	Vale Liwa (2012–2015)	Oman Shipping Company	2012	H1126	9566514	In service	
Shinas Max	Vale Shinas (2013–2015)	Oman Shipping Company	2013	H1127	9566538	In service	
Saham Max	Vale Saham (2013–2015)	Oman Shipping Company	2013	H1128	9566526	In service	
Bohai Shipbuilding Heavy Industry
Berge Everest		Berge Bulk	2011	BH416-1	9447536	In service	
Berge Aconcagua		Berge Bulk	2012	BH416-2	9447548	In service	
Berge Jaya		Berge Bulk	2012	BH416-3	9447550	In service	
Berge Neblina		Berge Bulk	2013	BH416-4	9447562	In service	

=== Second series ===
Name	Owner/operator	Year built	Yard number	IMO number	Status	Ref
Shanghai Waigaoqiao Shipbuilding
Yuan He Hai	China COSCO Bulk Shipping	2018	H1438	9806873	In service	
Yuan Gu Hai	China COSCO Bulk Shipping	2018	H1439	9806885	In service	
Yuan Yi Hai	China COSCO Bulk Shipping	2018	H1440	9806897	In service	
Yuan Bao Hai	China COSCO Bulk Shipping	2018	H1441	9806902	In service	
Yuan Jin Hai	China COSCO Bulk Shipping	2019	H1442	9806914	In service	
Yuan Shen Hai	China COSCO Bulk Shipping	2019	H1443	9806926	In service	
Yuan Fu Hai	China COSCO Bulk Shipping	2019	H1444	9806964	In service	
Pacific Unity	China Merchants Energy Shipping	2018	H1445	9806976	In service	
Pacific Harvest	China Merchants Energy Shipping	2018	H1446	9806988	In service	
Pacific Vision	China Merchants Energy Shipping	2018	H1447	9806990	In service	
Pacific Excellence	China Merchants Energy Shipping	2019	H1448	9807009	In service	
Yuan Hua Hai	China COSCO Bulk Shipping	2019	H1449	9806940	In service	
Yuan Sui Hai	China COSCO Bulk Shipping	2019	H1450	9806938	In service	
Yuan Qian Hai	China COSCO Bulk Shipping	2020	H1451	9806952	In service	
Qingdao Beihai Shipbuilding
Pacific Express	China Merchants Energy Shipping	2018	OC400K-1	9807724	In service	
Pacific Flourish	China Merchants Energy Shipping	2018	OC400K-2	9807736	In service	
Pacific Career	China Merchants Energy Shipping	2018	OC400K-3	9807748	In service	
Pacific Longevity	China Merchants Energy Shipping	2019	OC400K-4	9807011	In service	
Ore Tianjin	China Merchants Energy Shipping	2018	OC400K-5	9807023	In service	
Ore Dalian	China Merchants Energy Shipping	2018	OC400K-6	9807035	In service	
Ore Xiamen	China Merchants Energy Shipping	2018	OC400K-7	9807047	In service	
Ore Zhanjiang	China Merchants Energy Shipping	2019	OC400K-8	9807750	In service	
China Merchants Heavy Industry (Jiangsu)
Pacific Prosperity	China Merchants Energy Shipping	2018	CMHI-167-1	9807059	In service	
Pacific Auspice	China Merchants Energy Shipping	2019	CMHI-167-2	9807061	In service	
Jiangsu Yangzi Xinfu Shipbuilding
Ore Tangshan	China Merchants Energy Shipping	2018	YZJ2015-2272	9815202	In service	
Ore Shanghai	China Merchants Energy Shipping	2018	YZJ2015-2273	9815214	In service	
Ore Ningbo	China Merchants Energy Shipping	2019	YZJ2015-2274	9815226	In service	
Ore Hong Kong	China Merchants Energy Shipping	2018	YZJ2015-2275	9815238	In service	
Ore Shenzhen	China Merchants Energy Shipping	2018	YZJ2015-2276	9807695	In service	
Ore Guangzhou	China Merchants Energy Shipping	2018	YZJ2015-2277	9807700	In service	
Japan Marine United
NSU Carajas	NS United	2019	5166	9827865	In service	
NSU Brazil	NS United	2020	5167	9837987	In service	
NSU Tubarao	NS United	2020	5215	9848194	In service	

== See also ==
- List of longest ships
- TI-class supertanker
- Freedom Ship
