= MS Ore Brasil =

Very large ore carrier ship

History
- Name: Vale Brasil (2011–2014); Ore Brasil (2014–present)
- Owner: Vale Shipping Holding Pte. Ltd.
- Operator: Anglo Eastern Ship Management
- Port of registry: Hong Kong
- Route: Brazil to China
- Ordered: 26 October 2009
- Builder: Daewoo Shipbuilding & Marine Engineering Co., Ltd, South Korea
- Yard number: 1201
- Laid down: 15 November 2010
- Launched: 31 December 2010
- Completed: 30 March 2011
- In service: 2011–present
- Identification: IMO number: 9488918; Call sign: 9V9127; MMSI number: 56490500
- Status: In service

General characteristics
- Class & type: Valemax bulk carrier
- Tonnage: 198,980 GT; 67,993 NT; 402,347 DWT
- Length: 362.0 m (1,187.7 ft)
- Beam: 65.0 m (213.3 ft)
- Draught: 23.0 m (75.5 ft) (moulded)
- Depth: 30.4 m (100 ft)
- Installed power: MAN B&W 7S80ME-C8 (29,260 kW)
- Propulsion: Single shaft; fixed-pitch propeller
- Speed: 15.4 kn (28.5 km/h; 17.7 mph)
- Crew: 33

MS Ore Brasil, previously known as Vale Brasil, is a very large ore carrier owned by the Brazilian mining company Vale. She is the first of seven 400,000-ton very large ore carriers (VLOC) ordered by Vale from Daewoo Shipbuilding & Marine Engineering in South Korea and twelve from Jiangsu Rongsheng Heavy Industries in China, which are designed to carry iron ore from Brazil to Asia along the Cape route around South Africa. While close to the specifications of Chinamax, these ships are generally referred to as Valemax vessels by Vale. They are the largest bulk carriers ever built.

== Design ==
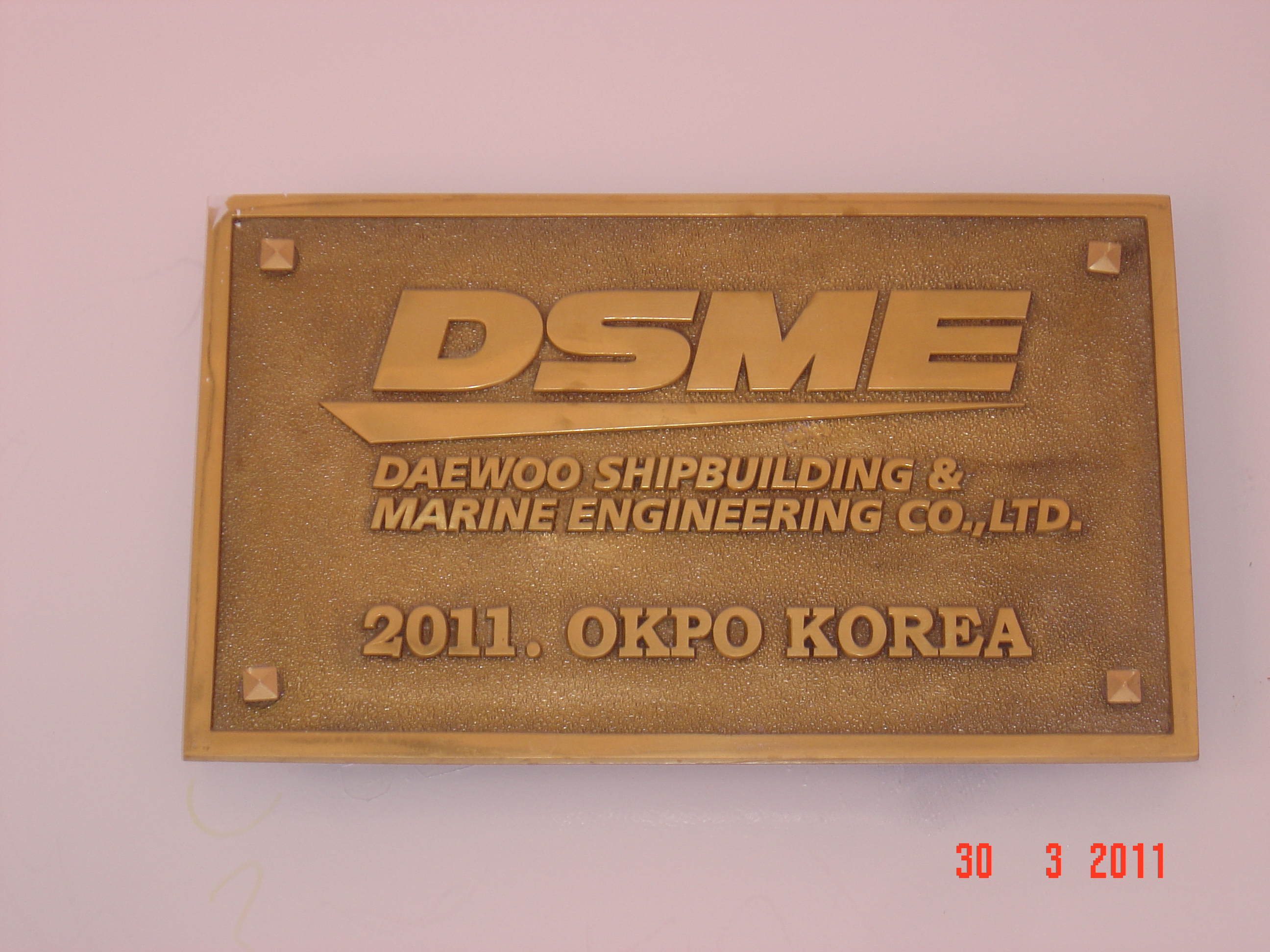
DSME Shipyard plaque

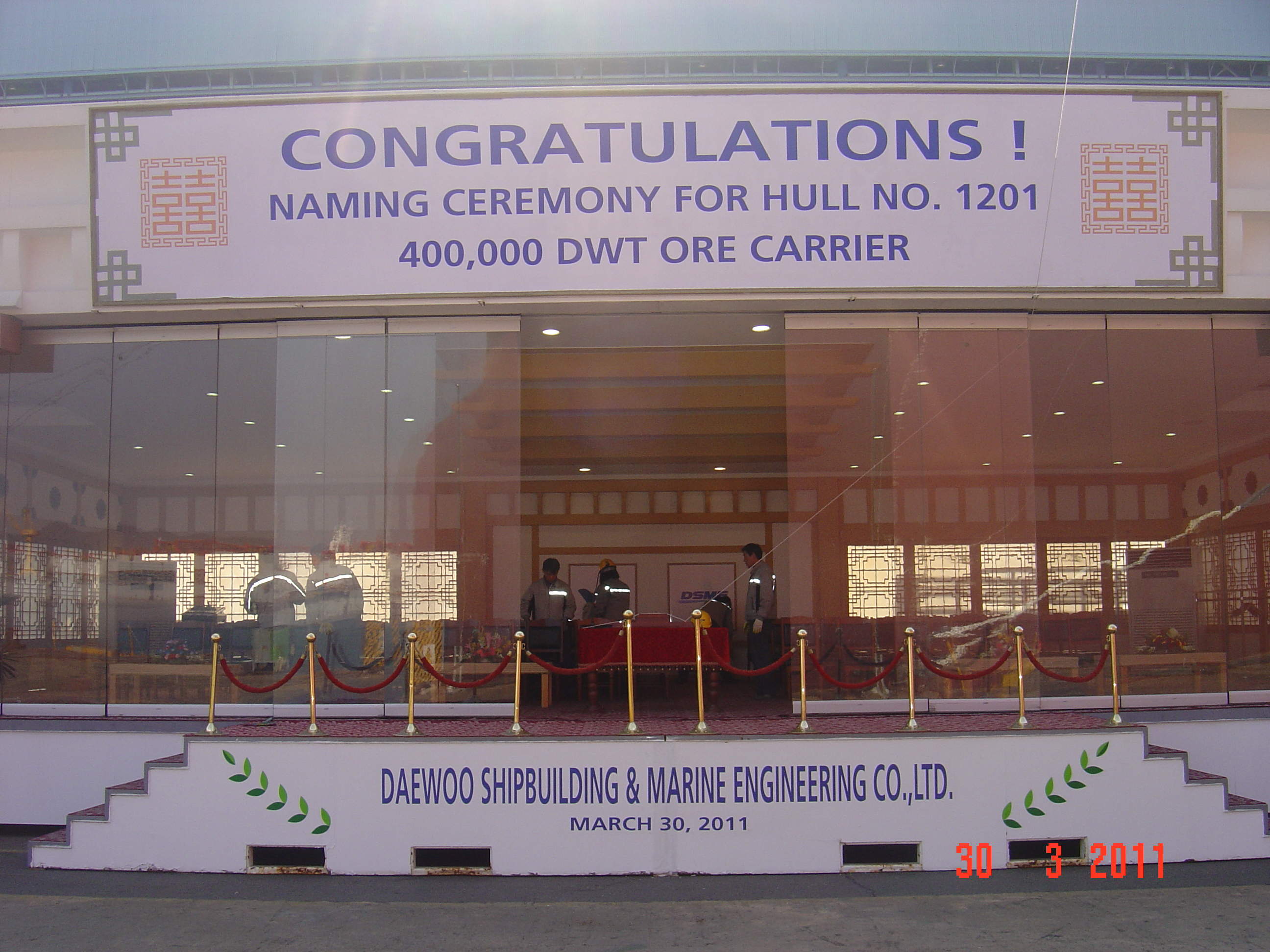
Naming ceremony of Vale Brasil

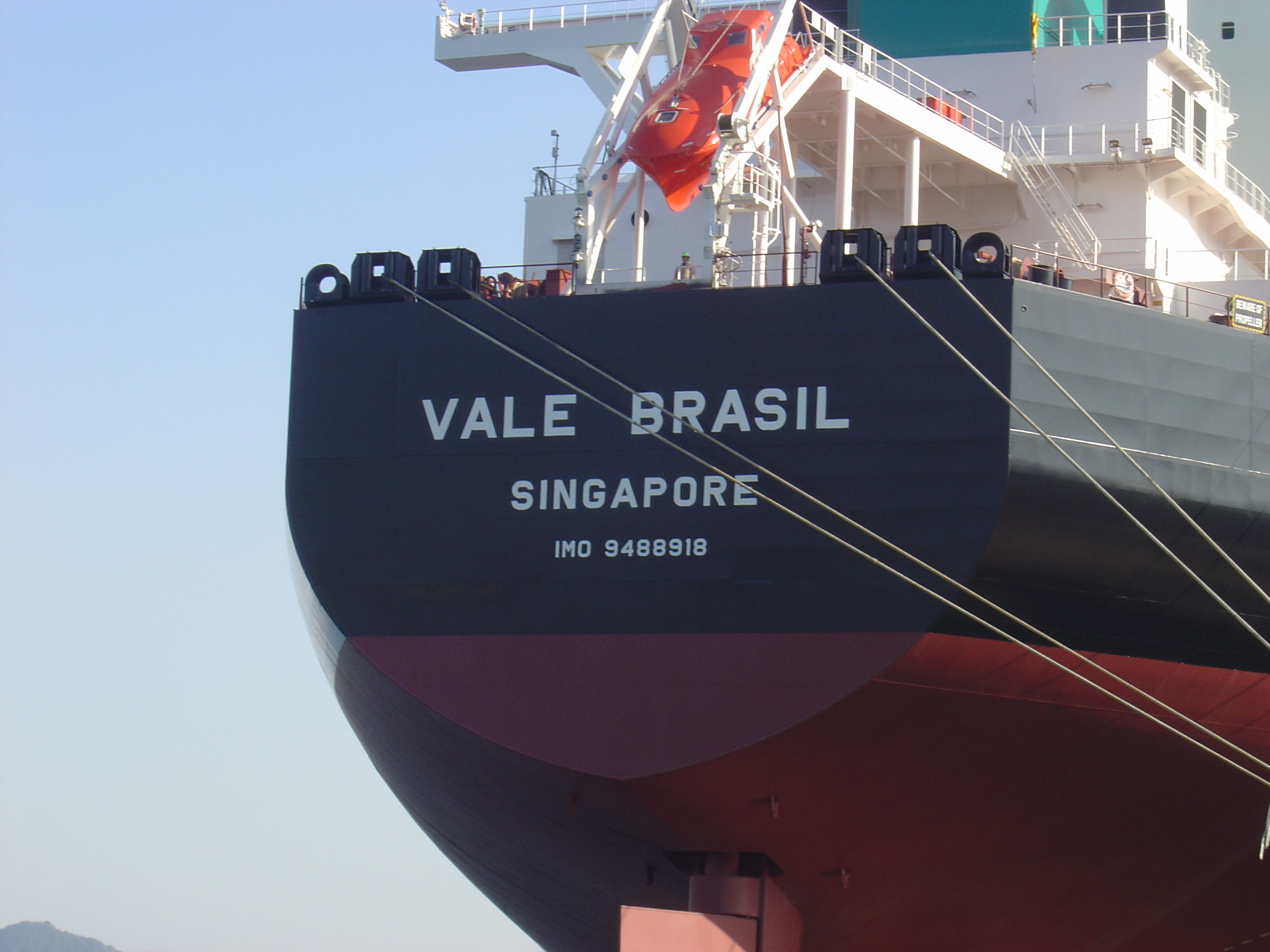
Vale Brasil at DSME yard

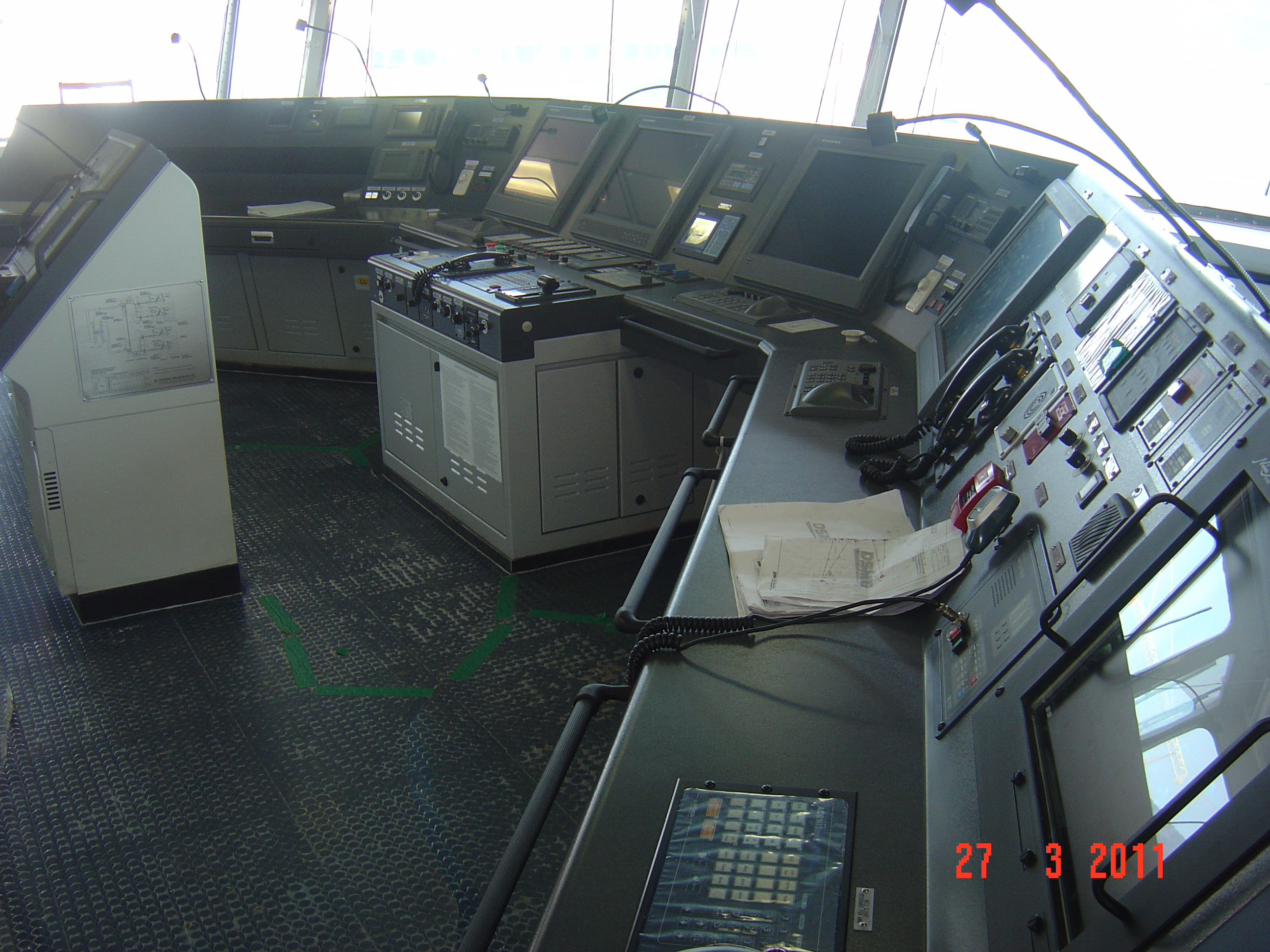
Bridge of Vale Brasil

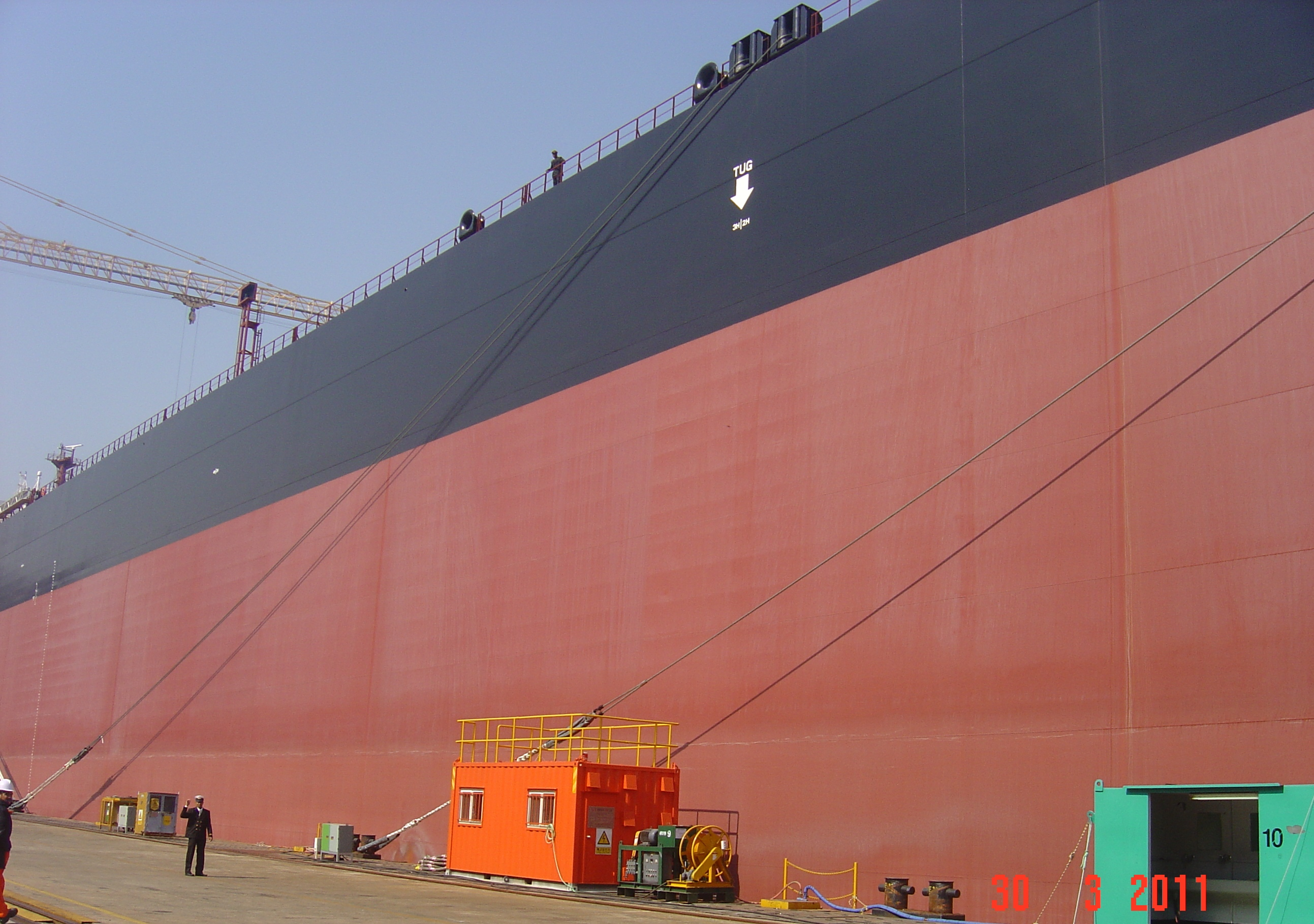
Vale Brasil at DSME yard. Note the 2 persons in comparison to the ship

The overall length of Ore Brasil is 362.0 metres (1,187.7 ft), making her one of the longest ships currently in service. The breadth and depth of her hull are 65.0 metres (213.3 ft) and 30.4 metres (99.7 ft), respectively, giving her a gross tonnage of 198,980.

Ore Brasil has seven cargo holds with a combined gross volume of 219,980 cubic metres and net tonnage of 67,993. Her deadweight tonnage is 402,347 tons. When carrying a full load of iron ore, equal to around 11,150 trucks, her draught is 23 metres (75.5 ft). Like other very large ore carriers of her size, Ore Brasil is limited to only a few deepwater ports in Brazil, Europe and China.

Ore Brasil is propelled by a single MAN B&W 7S80ME-C8 two-stroke low-speed diesel engine directly coupled to a fixed-pitch propeller. The main engine, which has a maximum output of 29,260 kilowatts (39,240 hp) at 78 rpm, burns 96.7 tons of heavy fuel oil per day. However, due to the large size of the vessel the emissions per cargo ton-mile are very low, making Ore Brasil in fact one of the most efficient long-distance dry bulk carriers in service, and for this reason the ship received the Clean Ship award of 2011 in the Norwegian shipping exhibition Nor-Shipping. Vale has reported 35 % drop in emissions per ton of cargo in comparison to older ships. Her service speed is 15.4 knots (28.5 km/h; 17.7 mph).

Ore Brasil is classified by Det Norske Veritas with a class notation of 1A1 Ore Carrier ESP ES(O) E0 NAUT-OC BWM-E(s) IB-3 COAT-PSPC(B) CSA-2 BIS EL-2 TMON NAUTICUS(Newbuilding).

== Size record ==
Ore Brasil is considerably larger than the previous record-holder, Berge Stahl, in every respect. Both her gross tonnage and deadweight tonnage are larger than those of the Norwegian ship, 175,720 and 364,767 tons, respectively. While the draught of both ships is the same, Ore Brasil is also 20 metres (65.6 ft) longer and 1.5 metres (4.9 ft) wider than Berge Stahl. In addition, Ore Brasil is larger and slightly longer than the four new 388,000-ton, 361-metre (1,184 ft) Chinamax bulk carriers Berge Bulk has ordered from China Shipbuilding Industry Corporation. Had Ore Brasil not been built, these ships would have become the largest bulk carriers in the world.

She is also the second largest ship currently in service by deadweight tonnage, second only to the TI class supertankers that have a deadweight tonnage of over 440,000 tons.

== Career ==
On 24 May 2011 Vale Brasil received her first cargo at the Brazilian port Terminal Marítimo de Ponta da Madeira — 391,000 tons of iron ore, enough to produce steel for more than three Golden Gate bridges, bound for Dalian in China. However, in June, after rounding the Cape of Good Hope, the ship was rerouted to Taranto, Italy, and turned back towards the Atlantic Ocean. There had been speculation that Vale Brasil was not allowed to enter the Chinese port fully laden, but according to Vale the destination was changed due to commercial, not political reasons. The ship arrived at the port of Taranto on 14 July 2011.

The ship was renamed Ore Brasil in 2014.

=== 400,000 ton controversy ===
The Valemax size ships as ordered by Vale have a deadweight tonnage of just over 400,000 tonnes, which was problematic as the Chinese government considered these ships too large to enter Chinese ports. As a result, the ships were "slimmed down" to 380,000 tonnes deadweight. The controversy arose as this change was only on paper and nothing was actually changed in the ship design. This alluded that Valemax ships bound to Chinese ports are simply not being loaded to maximum capacity - and with no change in their physical dimensions. Thus these same vessels "regained" their ability to re-enter the same ports they were previously declared too large to enter. Subsequently the Chinese government banned all ships over 300,000 DWT, effectively banning the Valemax ships from entering Chinese ports.

== See also ==
- List of world's longest ships
