= Berge Emperor =

1975 Japanese supertanker

History
- Name: Berge Emperor (1975–1985); Emperor (1985–1986)
- Owner: Bergesen d.y.
- Port of registry: Stavanger, Norway
- Yard number: 1004
- Launched: 30 August 1975
- Completed: 1975
- Maiden voyage: 1975
- In service: 1975
- Out of service: 1985
- Identification: IMO number: 7379917
- Fate: Scrapped at Kaohsiung, Taiwan in April 1986.

General characteristics
- Type: Supertanker
- Tonnage: 211,359 GT; 170,387 NT; 423,700 DWT
- Length: 381.83 m (1,252.7 ft)
- Beam: 68.05 m (223.3 ft)
- Draught: 22.788 m (74.76 ft)
- Installed power: 2 × Stal-Laval turbines
- Speed: 15.5 knots (28.7 km/h; 17.8 mph)

The Berge Emperor was a supertanker built in 1975, in Japan, by Mitsui. At 381.83 m (1,252.7 ft) and a deadweight tonnage of 423,700 tons she was one of the world's largest tankers. This class of crude oil tankers was called ULCCs (Ultra Large Crude Carriers).

She was built at the Mitsui Zosen shipyard in Japan and was launched on 30 August 1975. The ship was owned by Bergesen d.y. & Co.

As the world's oil consumption fell after the oil crisis of 1973 this vessel and many like it became superfluous. It was eventually laid up in the Vetlefjorden close to Ålesund in Norway and stayed there for years, while still on a long tern time charter to Shell.

When the charter expired the vessel was sold for recycling in 1985. The buyer was Maastow BV (a subsidiary of towage and salvage company Smit) in 1985, which renamed her Emperor and towed her to Taiwan. The ship recycling plants at Kaohsiung were the largest in the world at the time. The tanker arrived for recycling at Kaohsiung, Taiwan, on 30 March 1986.

The sistership "Berge Empress" was also laid up and then sold to Smit in a similar way. However, shortly before arrival at the recycling yard it was purchased by Norwegian company Norman International AS and renamed "Happy Empress". It sailed on for many more years and was eventually recycled in 2004.

== See also ==
- List of longest ships
- TI-class supertanker
- Freedom Ship
