= List of ship launches in 2018 =

The list of ship launches in 2018 includes a chronological list of ships launched in 2018.

Date	Ship	Class / type	Builder	Location	Country	Notes
7 January	Halunder Jet	Catamaran	Austal	Cebu	Philippines	For Flensburger Seerederei/Helgoline
19 January	W.B. Yeats	ferry	Flensburger Schiffbau Gesellschaft	Flensburg	Germany	For Irish Ferries
20 January	Ice Crystal		Ferus Smit	Westerbroek	Netherlands	For Erik Thun AB
22 January	Celebrity Edge	Edge-class cruise ship	STX France	Saint Nazaire	France	For Celebrity Cruises
26 January	One Stork	Bird-class container ship	Japan Marine United	Kure	Japan	For Ocean Network Express
31 January	Scenic Eclipse	cruise ship	Uljanik	Pula	Croatia	For Scenic Group
1 February	Antonio Marceglia	FREMM multipurpose frigate	Fincantieri		Italy	For Marina Militare
1 February	Normandie	FREMM multipurpose frigate	Naval Group	Lorient	France	For Marine Nationale
2 February	Symphony Space	Ferus Smit Ecobox	Ferus Smit	Leer	Germany	For Symphony Shipping BV
2 February	Yuan Gua Hai	Valemax	Shanghai WaiGaoQiao Shipbuilding	Shanghai	China	For China COSCO Shipping Corporation
2 February	Ever Goods	Evergreen G-class container ship	Imabari Shipbuilding	Marugame	Japan	For Evergreen Marine
6 February	Cosco Shipping Libra	Constellation-class container ship	Dalian Shipbuilding	Dalian	China	For China COSCO Shipping Corporation
7 February	Victoria of Wight	Ferry	Cemre Shipyard	Yalova	Turkey	For Wightlink.
9 February	Mærsk Hamburg	Maersk H-class container ship	Hyundai Heavy Industries		South Korea	For Maersk Line
14 February	Méditerranée XIV		Transmetal Industrie	Saint-Mandrier-sur-Mer	France	For TLV-TVM
16 February	Lieutenant Commander Paul Brutus	light pump boats	Socarenam	Boulogne	France	For City of Marseille
17 February	Norwegian Bliss	Breakaway-Pluy-class cruise ship	Meyer Werft	Papenburg	Germany	For Norwegian Cruise Line
17 February	MS Roald Amundsen	Expedition cruise ship	Kleven Verft	Ulsteinvik	Norway	For Hurtigruten
20 February	Arklow Viking	Arklow V-class cargo ship	Royal Bodewes	Hoogezand	Netherlands	For Arklow Shipping
24 February	One Minato	Millau Bridge-class container ship	Imabari Zosen	Hiroshima	Japan	For Ocean Network Express
2 March	George Bernard Shaw	Samuel Beckett-class offshore patrol vessel	Babcock Marine Ltd.	Appledore	United Kingdom	For Irish Naval Service.
2 March	Maastricht Mærsk	Maersk Triple E class	Daewoo	Geoje	Republic of Korea	For Maersk Line
8 March	Cosco Shipping Sagittarus	Constellation-class container ship	Shanghai Waigaogiao Shipbuilding		China	For China COSCO Shipping Corporation
20 March	HMS Trent	River-class patrol vessel	BAE Systems	Scotstoun	United Kingdom	For Royal Navy
29 March	Hypatia de Alejandría	ferry	Cantiere Navale Visentini		Italy	For Baleària
March	St. Nikolaus		Lux-Werft		Germany	
5 April	Seine	BSAH	Piriou		France	For French Navy
10 April	Cosco Shipping Andes	Himalayas-class container ship	Shanghai Jiangnan Changxing Shipbuilding	Shanghai	China	For China COSCO Shipping
18 April	USS Indianapolis (LCS-17)	Freedom-class littoral combat ship	Marinette Marine		United States	For United States Navy
21 April	CMA CGM Louis Bleriot	Antoine de Saint Exupery-class container ship	Hanjin Heavy Industries	Subic Bay Freeport Zone	Philippines	For CMA CGM
28 April	Monte Urbasa	crude oil tankler	Puerto Real	Navantia	Spain	For Ibaizábal
30 April	Pacific Harvest	Valemax	Shanghai WaiGaoQiao Shipbuilding	Shanghai	China	For China Merchants Energy Shipping
April		aircraft carrier	Dalian Shipyard		China	For Chinese Navy
3 May	Alf Pollak	car carrier	Flensburger Schiffbau Gesellschaft	Flensburg	Germany	For Siem Car Carrier
9 May	Ever Given	Evergreen G-class container ship	Imabari Shipbuilding	Marugame	Japan	For Evergreen Marine
10 May	Viking Jupiter	Venice-class cruise ship	Fincantieri	Ancona	Italy	For Viking Ocean Cruises
11 May	Mærsk Herrera	Maersk H-class container ship	Hyundai Heavy Industries		South Korea	For MMaersk Line
18 May	Arklow Villa	Arklow V-class cargo ship	Royal Bodewes	Hoogezand	Netherlands	For Arklow Shipping
19 May	Siem Ashanti	vehicle carrier	Maj shipyard	Rijeka	Croatia	For Siem Industries
19 May	HMAS Sydney	Hobart-class destroyer	ASC Pty Ltd	Adelaide	Australia	For Royal Australian Navy
24 May	Branddirektor Westphal		Fassmer	Bern	Germany	
25 May	Pyotr Morgunov	Ivan Gren-class landing ship	Yantar Shipyard	Kaliningrad	Russia	For Russian Navy
May	Elandess	yacht	Abeking & Rasmussen	Lemwerder	Germany	
May		aircraft carrier	Hanjin Heavy Industries	Busan	South Korea	For South Korea Navy
1 June	Mein Schiff 2	cruise ship	Meyer Turku	Turku	Finland	For TUI Cruises
10 June	Hondius		Brodosplit	Split	Croatia	For Oceanwide Expeditions
14 June	MSC Bellissima	project vista	STX France	Saint Nazaire	France	For MSC Cruises
22 June	Costa Venezia	Vista-class cruise ship	Fincantieri	Monfalcone	Italy	For Costa Crociere
28 June	Yuan Yi Hai	Valemax	Shanghai WaiGaoQiao Shipbuilding	Shanghai	China	For China COSCO Shipping Corporation
30 June	Yuan Bao Hai	Valemax	Shanghai WaiGaoQiao Shipbuilding	Shanghai	China	For China COSCO Shipping Corporation
14 July	Sir David Attenborough	Research ship	Cammell Laird	Birkenhead	United Kingdom	For Natural Environment Research Council
16 July		Ro-Ro ferry	Jinling shipyard		China	For DFDS
22 July	Hanseatic nature	Expedition-class cruise ship	VARD Tulcea SA	Tulcea	Romania	For Hapag-Lloyd Kreuzfahrten
July	Diogo Cao	dredger	Keppel Nantong		China	For Jan De Nul
2 August	Maria Grazia Onorato	car carrier	Flensburger Schiffbau Gesellschaft	Flensburg	Germany	
17 August	Mærsk Havana	Maersk H-class container ship	Hyundai Heavy Industries		South Korea	For MMaersk Line
21 August	AIDAnova	Excellence-class cruise ship	Meyer Werft	Papenburg	Germany	For AIDA Cruises
31 August	Arklow Wave		Ferus Smit	Leer	Germany	For Arklow Shipping
6 September	Port Said	Gowind-class corvette		Alexandria	Egypt	For Egyptian Navy
6 September	Pacific Vision	Valemax	Shanghai WaiGaoQiao Shipbuilding	Shanghai	China	For China Merchants Energy Shipping
14 September	Scot Carrier		Royal Bodewes	Hoogezand	Netherlands	
27 September	Pacific Prosperity	Valemax	China Merchants Heavy Industry	Jiangsu	China	For China Merchants Energy Shipping
September	passenger ship	For Lindblad Expeditions	Nichols Brothers Boat Builders	National Geographic Venture		
September	Rom-Moskau	tugboat	Cantiere Navale Vittoria		Italy	
10 October	Tamar	River-class patrol vessel	BAE Systems	Scotstoun	United Kingdom	For Royal Navy
15 October	Cosco Shipping Solar	Universe-class container ship	Shanghai WaiGaoQiao Shipbuilding	Shanghai	China	For China COSCO Shipping
28 October	World Explorer	cruise ship	WestSea Shipyard		Portugal	For Mystic Cruises
October		cruise ship	Barreras	Vigo	Spain	For Ritz Carlton Cruises
October	Express 4	High-speed catamaran	Austal	Henderson	Australia	For Molslinjen
10 November	Spartacus	Cutter suction dredger	Royal IHC	Krimpen aan den IJssel	Netherlands	For DEME
14 November	Ever Gentle	Evergreen G-class container ship	Imabari Shipbuilding	Marugame	Japan	For Evergreen Marine
23 November	ARM Reformador	Reformador-class frigate	ASTIMAR	Salina Cruz	Mexico	For Mexican Navy
November	HMAS Supply		Navantia	Ferrol	Spain	For Royal Australian Navy
6 December	Carnival Panorama	Vista-class cruise ship	Fincantieri	Marghera	Italy	For Carnival Cruise Line
8 December	Potsdam	Potsdam-class patrol boat	Fassmer	Bern	Germany	For Federal Police
9 December	Fridtjof Nansen		Kleven Verft		Norway	For Hurtigruten
9 December	Lyndon B. Johnson	Zumwalt-class destroyer	Bath Iron Works	Bath, Maine	United States	For United States Navy
14 December	Honfleur	ferry	Flensburger Schiffbau Gesellschaft	Flensburg	Germany	For Brittany Ferries
15 December	USS St. Louis (LCS-19)	Freedom-class littoral combat ship	Marinette Marine		United States	For United States Navy
15 December	Thun Evolve		Ferus Smit	Westerbroek	Netherlands	
15 December	Mærsk Huacho	Maersk H-class container ship	Hyundai Heavy Industries		South Korea	For MMaersk Line
22 December	Saint John Paul II	High-speed catamaran	Incat	Hobart, Tasmania	Australia	For Virtu Ferries
29 December	Cosco Shipping Star	Universe-class container ship	Shanghai WaiGaoQiao Shipbuilding	Shanghai	China	For China COSCO Shipping
December	Project Redwood	yacht	Lürssen	Bern	Germany	
December	Coral Adventurer	cruise ship			Vietnam	For Coral Expeditions
