= Seawise Giant =

ULCC tanker, longest ship in history

- TT Knock Nevis, formerly Seawise Giant, leaving the Dubai Drydocks

History
- Name: Seawise Giant (1979–1991); Happy Giant (1991); Jahre Viking (1991–2004); Knock Nevis (2004–2009); Mont (2009–2010)
- Owner: Amber Development (2009–2010); First Olsen Tankers Pte. (2004–2009); Loki Stream AS (1991–2004)
- Operator: Prayati Shipping (2009–2010)
- Port of registry: Norway (1980–2004); Singapore (2004–2010)
- Ordered: 1974
- Builder: Sumitomo Heavy Industries, Ltd.; Yokosuka, Kanagawa, Japan
- Completed: 1979
- Out of service: 1988 and 2009
- Identification: Call sign: S6AV7; DNV ID: 16864; IMO number: 7381154; MMSI no.: 564687016
- Fate: Scrapped in 2010

General characteristics
- Type: Crude oil tanker
- Tonnage: 260,941 GT; 214,793 NT; 564,763 DWT
- Displacement: 81,879 long tons light load; 646,642 long tons full load
- Length: 458.45 m (1,504.10 ft)
- Beam: 68.6 m (225.07 ft)
- Draft: 24.611 m (80.74 ft)
- Depth: 29.8 m (97.77 ft)
- Propulsion: 2 Mitsubishi V2M8 boilers (Designed by Combustion Engineering); Sumitomo Stal-Laval AP steam turbine, 50,000 hp
- Speed: 16.5 knots (30.6 km/h; 19.0 mph)
- Capacity: 4,100,000 bbl (650,000 m^{3}).

TT Seawise Giant—formerly Oppama; later Happy Giant, Jahre Viking, Knock Nevis, and Mont—was a ULCC supertanker and the longest self-propelled ship ever built. It was constructed in 1974–1979 by Sumitomo Heavy Industries in Yokosuka, Kanagawa, Japan. Seawise Giant's engines were powered by Ljungström turbines. The ship had the greatest deadweight tonnage ever recorded. Fully laden, she displaced 657,019 tonnes.

When the ship was built, it was the heaviest self-propelled ship of any kind. With a laden draft of 24.6 m (81 ft) and a length of 458.45 m (1,504.1 ft), the ship was incapable of navigating the English Channel, the Suez Canal or the Panama Canal. She is generally considered the largest self-propelled ship ever built. In 2013, her overall length was surpassed by 30 m (98 ft) by the floating liquefied natural gas (FLNG) installation Shell Prelude, a monohull barge design 488 m (1,601 ft) long with 600,000 tonnes displacement..

The ship was damaged in an airstrike in 1988 during the Iran–Iraq War but later repaired and restored to service. The vessel was moored off the coast of Qatar in the Persian Gulf at the Al Shaheen Oil Field in 2004 and converted to a floating storage and offloading (FSO) unit.

Seawise Giant was sold to Indian ship breakers and renamed Mont for her final journey in December 2009. After clearing Indian customs, the ship sailed to Alang Ship Breaking Yard in Alang, Gujarat, and beached for scrapping, which was completed in 2010.

== History ==
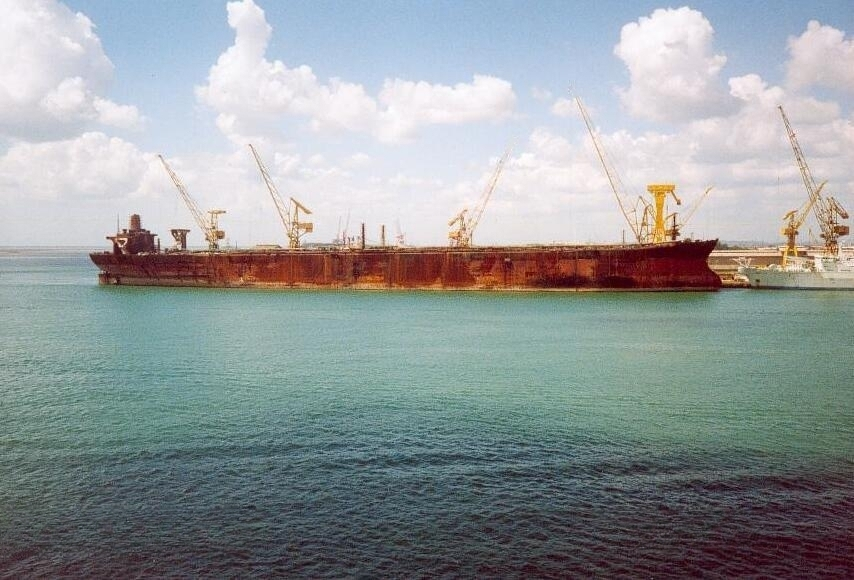
Seawise Giant during repairs in Singapore on 27 December 1990, after being struck by an Iraqi Exocet missile in May of 1988 during the Iran–Iraq War

Seawise Giant was ordered in 1974 and delivered in 1979 by Sumitomo Heavy Industries, Ltd. (S.H.I.) at Oppama shipyard in Yokosuka, Kanagawa, Japan, as a 418,611-ton Ultra Large Crude Carrier (ULCC). The vessel remained unnamed for a long time, and was identified by her hull number, 1016. During sea trials, 1016 exhibited severe vibration problems while going astern. The unknown Greek owner refused to take delivery and the vessel was subject to a lengthy arbitration proceeding. Following settlement, the vessel was sold and named Oppama by S.H.I.

The shipyard exercised its right to sell the vessel and a deal was brokered with Hong Kong Orient Overseas Container Line founder C. Y. Tung to lengthen the ship by several metres and add 146,152 tonnes of cargo capacity through jumboisation. Two years later the ship was relaunched as Seawise Giant. "Seawise", a pun on "C.Y.'s", was used in the names of other ships owned by C.Y. Tung, including Seawise University.

After the refit, the ship had a capacity of 564,763 tonnes deadweight (DWT), a length overall of 458.45 m (1,504.1 ft) and a draft of 24.611 m (80.74 ft). She had 46 tanks, and 31,541 m^{2} (339,500 sq ft) of deck space. When Seawise Giant was fully loaded, her 25 meter/81 foot draft was too deep to safely navigate the relatively shallow English Channel. The rudder weighed 230 tons, and the propeller weighed 50 tons.

Seawise Giant was damaged in 1988 during the Iran–Iraq War by an Iraqi Air Force attack while anchored off Larak Island, Iran on 14 May 1988 while carrying Iranian crude oil. The ship was struck by French-made Exocet missiles launched from Iraqi aircraft. Fires ignited aboard the ship, spreading to the oil leaked into the surrounding water and blazing out of control. The vessel did not sink.

After the fires were extinguished, the remaining cargo was discharged to other tankers. The ship was declared a constructive total loss, meaning she was intact but so damaged that she would not be economical to repair.

Shortly after the Iran–Iraq war ended, a Norwegian investment firm managed by Finanshuset bought the damaged vessel, which had by then been towed to a lay-up location off Labuan. The manager was Norman International AS, a Norwegian ship manager that was subsequently dissolved in 1992. The vessel was then towed from Labuan to Singapore and repaired at the Keppel Corporation. She was renamed Happy Giant, in line with Norman International's tradition of naming tankers with the prefix «Happy» and bulkers with the prefix «Norman». She re-entered service in October 1991.

Jørgen Jahre bought the tanker in 1991 for US$39 million and renamed her Jahre Viking. From 1991 to 2004, she was owned by various Norwegian investment firms and flew the flag of Norway.

In 2004, the tanker was purchased by First Olsen Tankers, renamed Knock Nevis, and converted into a permanently moored storage tanker in the Qatar Al Shaheen Oil Field in the Persian Gulf.

Knock Nevis was renamed Mont and reflagged to Sierra Leone by new owners Amber Development for a final voyage to India where she was scrapped by Priya Blue Industries at Alang. The vessel was beached on 22 December 2009. Due to the vessel's extreme size, scrapping took until the end of 2010. The ship's 36 tonne anchor was saved and donated to the Hong Kong Maritime Museum in 2010. It was later moved to a Hong Kong Government Dockyard building on Stonecutters Island.

As of 20 November 2025, the anchor of Seawise Giant is now on public display in the newly opened Anchor Plaza outside piers 9 and 10 of the Central Ferry Pier.

== Size record ==
Knock Nevis, ex-Seawise Giant (in red) compared to large ships and buildings: The Pentagon, 1,414 feet, 431 m RMS Queen Mary 2, 1,132 feet, 345 m USS Enterprise, 1,123 feet, 342 m Hindenburg, 804 feet, 245 m Yamato, 863 feet, 263 m Empire State Building, 1,454 feet, 443 m Seawise Giant, 1,503 feet, 458 m Apple Park, 1,522 feet, 464 m

Seawise Giant was the longest ship ever constructed, at 458.45 m (1,504.1 ft), longer than the height of many of the world's tallest buildings, including the 451.9 m (1,483 ft) Petronas Towers.

Despite her length, Seawise Giant was not the largest ship by gross tonnage, ranking sixth at 260,941 GT, behind the crane ship Pioneering Spirit and the four 274,838 to 275,276 GT Batillus-class supertankers. She was the longest and largest by deadweight at 564,763 tonnes.

Seawise Giant was featured on the BBC series Jeremy Clarkson's Extreme Machines while sailing as Jahre Viking. According to captain Surrinder Kumar Mohan, the ship could reach up to 16.5 knots (30.6 km/h) in good weather. It took 9 km (5 1/2 miles) for the ship to stop from that speed, and the turning circle in clear weather was about 3 km (2 miles).

=== Gallery ===
A comparison diagram of the Knock Nevis with several large buildings. From left to right: Eiffel Tower, Empire State Building, Petronas Towers, Seawise Giant, Willis Tower, Taipei 101 and Burj Khalifa.

Size comparison of some of the longest ships. From top to bottom: Seawise Giant, Maersk Mc-Kinney Møller, Vale Brasil, Allure of the Seas, and USS Enterprise.

== See also ==
- List of longest ships
- TI-class supertanker
- Freedom Ship
- T/T Jahre Viking Datasheet
