= Zhonghai Emeishan =

Floating drydock

Zhonghai Emeishan (中海峨眉山) is the world's largest floating drydock. It is used for the repair and reconstruction of very large ships.

Built in only 416 days, it was launched in September 2008 in Yangzhou in a ceremony involving senior municipal officials, including the mayor. It was delivered to the Shanghai Changxing ship repair base in October 2008. Construction cost 580 million Yuan; it has a high level of automation.

== Specifications ==
- Length: 410m
- Beam: 82m
- Moulded depth: 28m
- Displacement: 42000 tonnes
- Lifting capacity: 85000 tonnes

== See also ==
- List of world's longest ships
- No.5 Royal Dock
