= No.5 Royal Dock =

South Korean floating dry dock

The No.5 Royal Dock is a floating dry dock being built by Daewoo Shipbuilding & Marine Engineering (DSME); when complete, it will be the largest floating drydock in the world.

== Specification ==
The No.5 Royal Dock will be 432m long, 85.6m wide, and will have a capacity of 130,000dwt.

No.5 Royal Dock follows on from No.4 Royal Dock, which is 438m long, 84m wide, and a capacity of 120,000t.

== History ==
Construction began in November 2011; the cutting of the first steel was marked with a ceremony at the Daehan Shipbuilding yard (which is managed by DSME).

As of November 2012, it was expected to be completed and delivered to the Okpo yard in December 2012.

No.5 Royal Dock will be used to construct other very large ships such as FPSOs, LNG carriers, and container ships; it will increase DSME's shipbuilding capacity.

== See also ==
- List of world's longest ships
- Zhonghai Emeishan
