= Majishan =

Island in Zhejiang, China

Native name: 马迹山
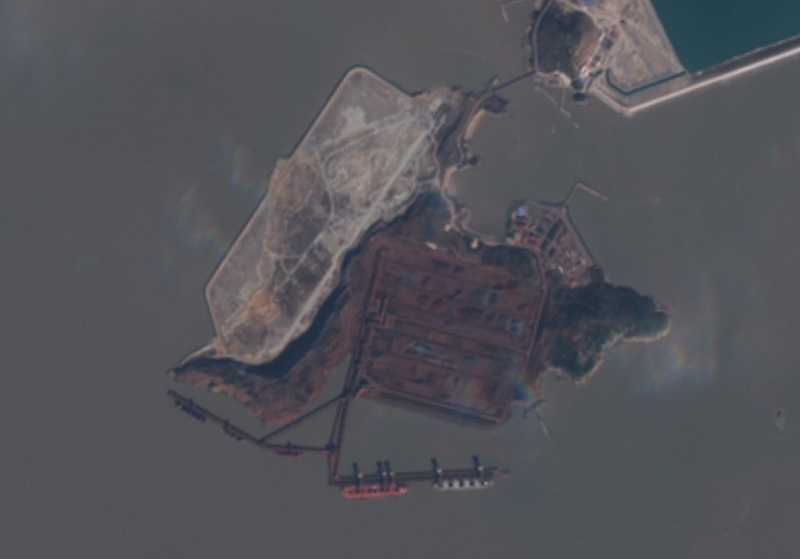

- Location within Zhejiang

Geography
- Coordinates: 30.6794°N 122.4178°E
- Area: 1.491 km^{2} (0.576 sq mi)

Majishan is an island part of Shengsi County, Zhoushan, Zhejiang, China. Geographically it is one of the Shengsi Islands. The island has an area of 1.491 km^{2}, including 0.467 km^{2} of land reclaimed during the construction project of Baosteel's ore transit base starting in 1997. It was originally an isolated island, after Zhoushan City implemented a relocation project of the island, most of the population on the island was moved to Maguan village on Shengsi Island just north. Most of the land is now used by the Baosteel ore transfer base, which opened in 2004. A bridge has been built to connect the island with Shengsi island. In 2006, the MS Berge Stahl, one of the largest ships at the time, visited the port of Majishan.
