= MS Berge Stahl =

Bulk carrier

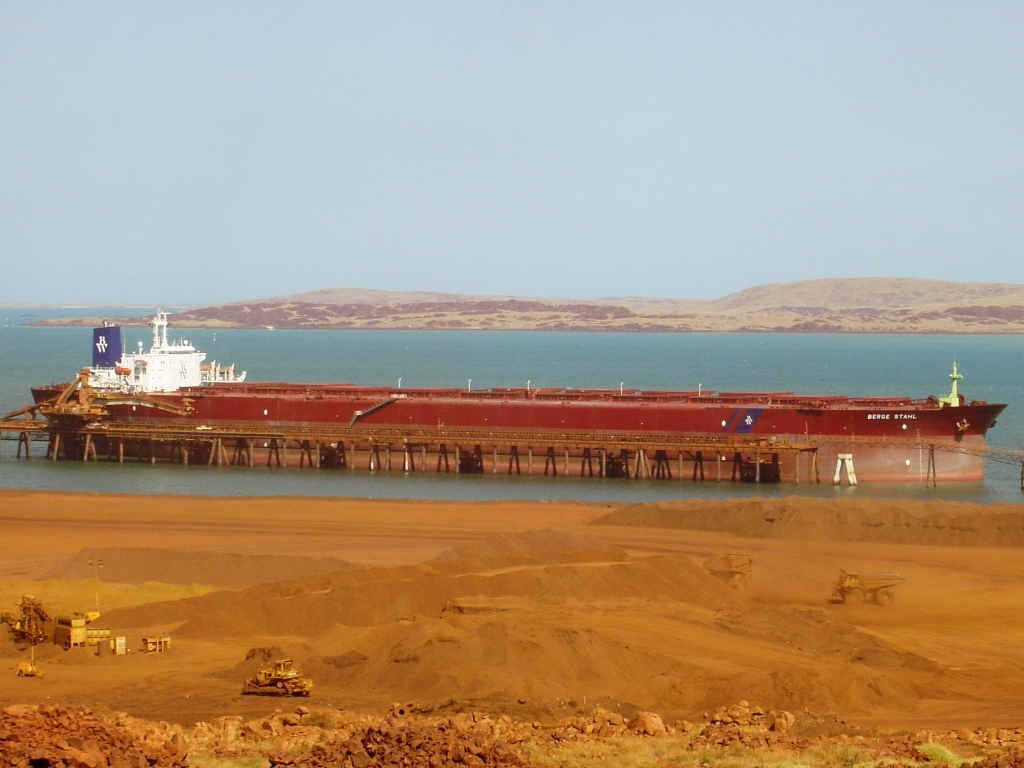
- Berge Stahl

History
- Name: Berge Stahl (1986-2021); Geostahl (since 2021)
- Owner: 1986–2008: Partrederiet Bergesen GOIC DA; 2008–2009: Bergesen D.Y. Shipping AS; 2009–2012: BW Bulk (Norway) AS; 2012: Berge Stahl Company S.A. (under Berge Bulk)
- Operator: 1986–2008: Bergesen Worldwide Gas ASA; 2008–2012: BW Fleet Management Pte. Ltd.; Since 2012: Berge Bulk
- Port of registry: 1986–2011: Stavanger Norway; 2011–2021: Douglas Isle of Man; since 2021: Comoros
- Route: Brazil to Oman Previously Brazil to Rotterdam
- Builder: Hyundai Heavy Industries Co., Ltd.; Ulsan, South Korea
- Laid down: 14 March 1986
- Launched: 4 September 1986
- Completed: 4 December 1986
- Identification: DNV ID: 14702; Call sign: 2EZE5; IMO number: 8420804; MMSI number: 235089333
- Fate: Scrapped Gadani July 2021

General characteristics
- Type: Bulk carrier (Ore carrier)
- Tonnage: 175,720 GT; 364,767 DWT
- Length: 342.08 m (1,122.3 ft)
- Beam: 63.53 m (208.4 ft)
- Draught: 23 m (75 ft)
- Installed power: Hyundai B&W 7L90MCE
- Propulsion: Single shaft; 9 m (30 ft) fixed pitch propeller
- Speed: 13.5 knots (25.0 km/h; 15.5 mph)
- Crew: 24

MS Berge Stahl was a bulk carrier. Until the delivery of MS Vale Brasil in 2011 she was the longest and largest iron ore carrier in the world. She was registered in Comoros. Before that, she was registered in Douglas, Isle of Man, Stavanger, Norway as well as in Monrovia, Liberia.

An iron ore carrier, Berge Stahl had a capacity of 364,767 tonnes deadweight (DWT) . She was built in 1986 by Hyundai Heavy Industries. The vessel was 342.08 m (1,122 ft) long, had a beam, or width, of 63.5 m (208 ft), and a draft, or depth in the water, of 23 m (75 ft).

Her MAN B&W 7L90MCE diesel engine drove a single 9 m (30 ft) propeller giving a top speed of 13.5 knots (25.0 km/h; 15.5 mph).

Because of its massive size, Berge Stahl could originally only tie up, fully loaded, at two ports in the world, hauling ore from the Terminal Marítimo de Ponta da Madeira in Brazil to the Europoort near Rotterdam in the Netherlands. Even at these ports, passage must be timed to coincide with high tides to prevent the ship running aground. Berge Stahl made this trip about ten times each year, or a round-trip about every five weeks.

The newly opened deep-water iron ore wharf at Caofeidian in China received the fully loaded Berge Stahl in October 2011, and several other Chinese ports have since opened to receive Vale's even larger Valemax ships. Berge Stahl can operate from other ports if not fully loaded. In September 2006, the ship carried ore to the port of Majishan, China. On the return voyage to Rotterdam, the ship picked up a partial load of ore in Dampier, Western Australia, and Saldanha Bay in South Africa (where the maximum draft permitted is 21 m). In April 2014, the Berge Stahl received her last dry-docking, in Portugal. The owner, Berge Bulk, announced that the thirty-year-old vessel performed her last voyage to Rotterdam in the autumn of 2016. She was then headed for dry dock, where she was refitted before commencing a new contract transporting iron ore from the Port of Tubarão in Brazil to Sohar, Oman.

In July 2021 the ship was beached at Gadani ship-breaking yard and scrapped.

== See also ==
- List of longest ships
- TI-class supertanker
