= China Merchants Energy Shipping =

Chinese shipping and logistics company

China Merchants Energy Shipping Company Limited 招商局能源运输股份有限公司
- Company type: State-owned enterprise
- Industry: Shipping and Logistics
- Founded: 2004
- Headquarters: Shanghai, People's Republic of China
- Area served: People's Republic of China
- Key people: Chairman: Mr. Fu Yuning
- Products: Energy transportation
- Owner: China Merchants Group
- Parent: China Merchants Group
- Website: China Merchants Energy Shipping Company Limited

China Merchants Energy Shipping Company Limited (SSE: 601872), parented by China Merchants Group, is engaged in shipping industry, including tanker transportation, bulk cargo vessel transportation. Other businesses include training for sailors and sales of electronic ship machinery. It is headquartered in Shanghai, China. They are the parent company for China VLOC Company Limited, a wholly owned subsidiary that manages four VLOCs they had previously acquired from Vale.

Its A shares were listed on the Shanghai Stock Exchange in 2006.

In September 2010, China Merchants announced that it planned to double the capacity of its dry bulk fleet by early 2012.
