= Freedom Ship =

Proposed floating city project

General information
- Classification: Floating city

Height
- Roof: 85 m (279 ft)

Technical details
- Size: 1.8 km (5,906 ft) long, 250 m (820 ft) wide
- Floor count: 25

Design and construction
- Architect: Freedom Cruise Line International

Other information
- Number of rooms: 50,000 living units, 3,000 commercial units, 2,400 time-share units and 10,000 hotel units)

Website
- www.freedomship.com

The Freedom Ship is a floating city project proposed in the late 1990s by engineer Norman Nixon. The namesake of the project reflects the designer's vision of a mobile ocean colony, such that it is free from the property, municipal, or federal laws of any nation states.

The project envisioned an integrated city built on a series of linked barges, with a combined length of 1,800 metres (5,900 ft). The complex would be equipped with condominium housing for 80,000 people, a hospital, school system, hotel, casino, commercial and office occupancies, duty-free shopping and other facilities large enough to require rapid transit, and would have continuously circumnavigated the globe, stopping regularly at ports of call.

== Construction ==
A side view of the proposed Freedom Ship. The largest ship built in the world, the Seawise Giant, was approximately one quarter of this length.

Freedom Ship International initially estimated the net cost for construction to be US$6 billion in 1999. However, by 2002, estimates had risen to US$11 billion. A July 2008 press release explained the difficulty of obtaining reliable financial backing. In November 2013, the company announced that the project, now with an estimated price of US$10 billion, was being resurrected, though that construction had not yet begun. In 2016, the project affiliated with Kanethara Marine in India. By 2026, estimates had risen to US$15 billion, and then up to US$20 billion.

== Similar projects ==
The basic idea had been published by Jules Verne in his novel Propeller Island. No technical details were given, but the book includes the idea of building a gigantic raft. The main aim of the project was saving taxes, as the Island would move around the world on an annual basis.

Other projects, such as the ResidenSea, have similarly attempted to create mobile communities, though they have conservatively limited themselves to the constraints of conventional shipbuilding. In regard to the economic flexibility and "freedom" created by such mobile settlements, these projects could be considered a realization of the avant-garde Walking City concept from 1964, by British architect Ron Herron of the group Archigram. The Freedom Ship also served as the inspiration for (and is closely resembled by) the Libertania, a mobile ship depicted in Grant Morrison's comic book The Filth. In the 1950s, Buckminster Fuller also proposed "floating cities" approximately a mile wide that could accommodate up to 50,000 permanent inhabitants. Mike Wallace interviewed Buckminster Fuller on TV regarding this "floating cities" concept, which Fuller explained would free up land needed for agriculture and industrial uses.

== See also ==
- Azimuth thruster – Steerable propulsion pod under a watercraft
- MS The World – Residential cruise ship
- Seasteading – Concept of creating permanent dwellings at sea
