= Nor-Shipping =

Norwegian maritime trade fair

Coordinates: 59.950369°N 11.055551°E

Nor-Shipping is a maritime trade fair that has been held in Norway biennially since 1965. It is one of the leading international shipping events and an important meeting place and forum for the shipping industry. It "remains one of the most pivotal and well-attended events of the marine and offshore calendar." The other major international shipping fairs are Posidonia in Athens and the Shipbuilding, Machinery and Marine Technology (SMM) show in Hamburg.

The week-long fair is organized by Norges Varemesse (Norway Trade Fairs) and held in Lillestrøm near Oslo in May or June. It features exhibitions, conferences, debates, product launches and social occasions. The fair attracts shipowners, ship builders, classification societies, technology suppliers, shipbrokers, innovators, ship financiers and industry leaders.

During the trade fair week, the fair also presented an exhibition called Ocean Talent Camp (previously Nor-Shipping Campus) in the Oslo city center. It promotes careers within the industry and was visited by about 10,000 students at the 2013 event.

In 2017 there were around 15,500 visitors at the event, plus 900 exhibiting companies from 48 countries, 19 of which had their own national pavilions.

== History ==
The predecessor to Nor-Shipping was Deck and Engine Room, held for the first time in the early 1960s by Norwegian Industrial Fairs (now Norway Trade Fairs) in cooperation with the magazine ‘‘Skip’’ (Ship). The first two times it was held, the event focused on local seafarers and their work on board local ships. Norwegian shipowner and magazine publisher Per Selvig saw the potential for an international shipping exhibition, and contacted Edvard Mowinckel-Larsen, then head of Norwegian Industrial Fairs, to propose a more international focus. Organized with the support of Selvig’s ‘‘Norwegian Shipping News’’ journal, the event was renamed International Shipping Exhibition and opened in Oslo during May 1965. A slump in maritime markets in the late 1960s meant that the next exhibition was not staged until late May 1968. The Nor-Shipping name was used for the third exhibition in 1971.

In the course of the four times the biennial event has been held since 2003, it has shifted focus from technology to becoming a meeting place for a wider spectrum of interests.

== Exhibition ==
A total of 22,500 square meters of exhibition space is spread over six halls and exhibitions are divided into six broad themes: IT and navigation; safety and rescue; shipbuilding and repair; maritime services and logistics; propulsion and machinery; maritime services and logistics; and innovation and venture.

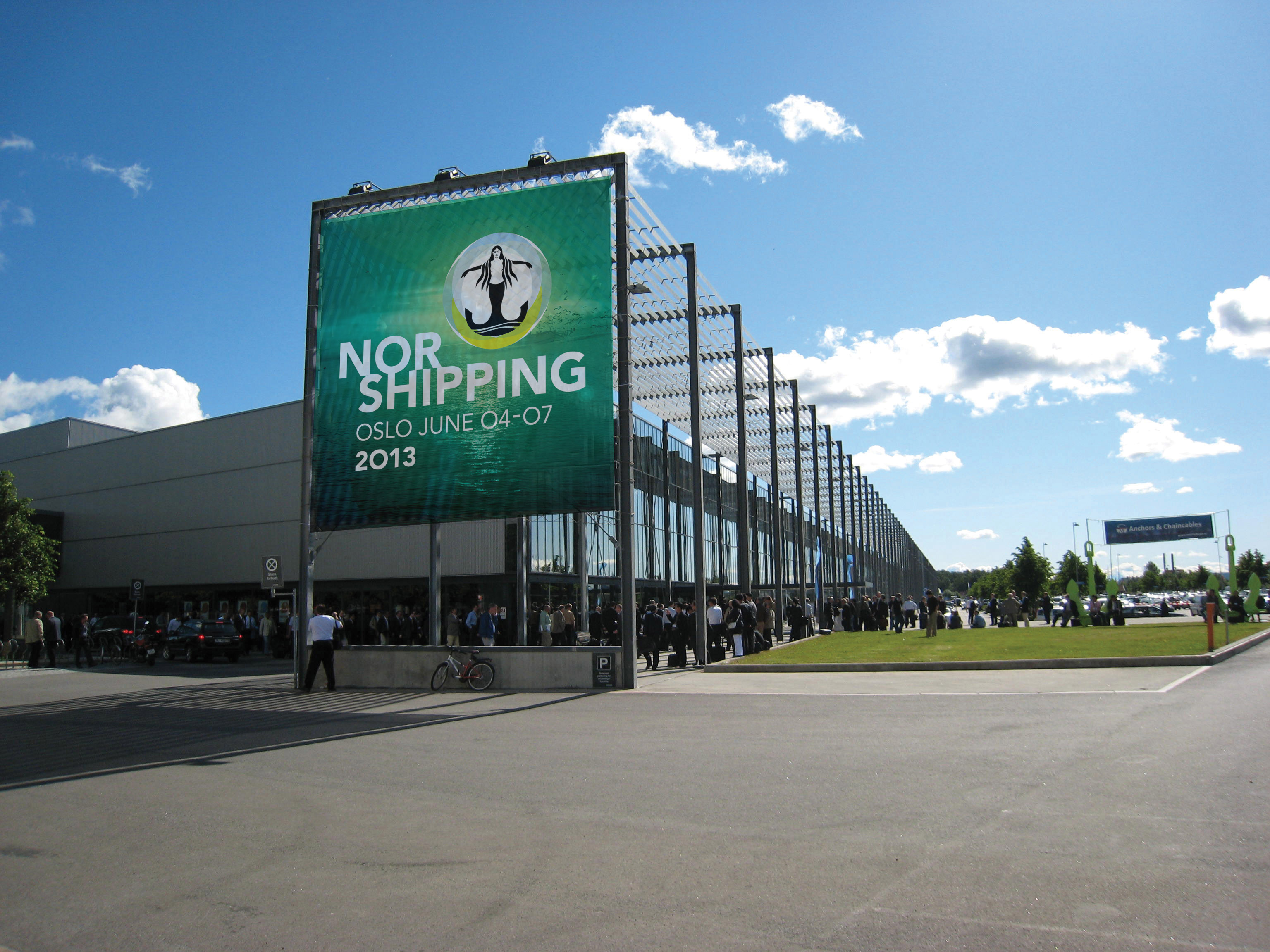
An artist's impression of the entrance to Nor-Shipping 2013

== Conferences ==
The two Nor-Shipping conferences attract leading maritime industry personalities, both as participants, who take part in interviews and round-table discussions, and delegates. Former CNN International financial editor Todd Benjamin frequently hosts the interviews and discussions.

=== Opening conference ===
The opening conference includes the presentation of the Nor-Shipping Awards. Speakers at these conferences have included Tor Olav Trøim of Frontline, Peter Evensen from Teekay Corporation, Andreas Sohmen-Pao of BW Group and secretaries general of the International Maritime Organization. Some 1,000 attended the 2013 conference.

=== Agenda Offshore conference ===
The Agenda Offshore conference was established in 2011 to acknowledge the link between shipping and the oil and gas industry. Speakers have included José Sergio Gabrielli, the CEO of Petrobras, Statoil CEO Helge Lund and US Coast Guard Jeffrey G. Lantz, as have National Oilwell Varco’s Pete Miller and John Ridgway from BP Shipping. Issues of interest to the offshore industry are debated here, such as the Deepwater Horizon oil spill.

== Awards ==
The Nor-Shipping Awards include the Energy Efficiency Award, Next Generation Ship Award and Young Entrepreneur Award. The 2013 winners were respectively Fjord Lines’ Stavangerfjord, TOTE's 3,100 TEU containership and Tor M. Østervold of Norway’s ECOsubsea.

== Supporting events ==
Organizers have increasingly added supporting events to the trade fair week. “Nor-Shipping is as much known for its evening parties as for the growing number of daytime events.” This includes its barbecue, “the largest event of its kind in Norway with 2,500 guests” and the more recently established closing party, as well as Nor-Shipping Venture Forum and Nor-Shipping Shipowners’ Forum.
