= Chinamax =

Ship size class

General characteristics
- Tonnage: 400,000 DWT
- Length: 360 m (1,181 ft)
- Beam: 65 m (213 ft)
- Draft: 24 m (79 ft)

Comparison of bounding box of Chinamax with some other ship sizes in isometric view.

Chinamax is a standard of ship measurements that allow conforming ships to use various harbours when fully laden, the maximum size of such a ship being 24 m (79 ft) draft, 65 m (213 ft) beam and 360 m (1,180 ft) length overall. An example of ships of this size is the Valemax bulk carriers.

The standard was originally developed to carry very large loads of iron ore to China from Brazilian port facilities operated by mineral firm Vale.

Correspondingly, harbours and other infrastructure that are "Chinamax-compatible" are those at which such ships can readily dock. Unlike Suezmax and Panamax, Chinamax is not determined by locks or channels, or bridges—the Chinamax standard is aimed at port provisions and the name is derived from the massive dry-bulk (ore) shipments that China receives from around the globe.

In container shipping, recent classes intended for trade with China have all focused on a ~400 meter length, which deep water container terminals can cater for.

== Examples ==
- Lolabé, Cameroon—iron ore port.
- Pointe-Noire, Quebec—iron ore port.

== See also ==
- List of Panamax ports
- Cargo ship sizes Handymax, Panamax, Suezmax, Capesize
