= List of longest ships =

Size comparison between five of the longest ships of their type

The world's longest ships are listed according to their overall length (LOA), which is the maximum length of the vessel measured between the extreme points in fore and aft. In addition, the ships' deadweight tonnage (DWT) and/or gross tonnage (GT) are presented as they are often used to describe the size of a vessel.

The ships are listed by type. Only ship types for which there exists a ship longer than 300 metres (1,000 ft) are included. For each type, the list includes current record-holders either as individual ships, ship classes or standard designs, up to four runner-ups, and all longer ships that have been scrapped.

The list does not include non-self-propelled floating structures such as the 488 m (1,601 ft) long Prelude FLNG.

== Oil tankers ==
Name	Length overall	DWT	GT/GRT	In service	Status	Notes	Image	Ref
Seawise Giant	458.46 m (1,504 ft)	564,650 DWT	260,851 GT	1979–2009	Broken up	Originally smaller, jumboisation made Seawise Giant the largest ship ever by length, displacement (657,019 tonnes), and deadweight tonnage.		
Batillus class (4 ships)	414.22 m (1,359 ft)	553,661–555,051 DWT	274,837–275,276 GT	1976–2003	Broken up	The largest and longest ships ever to be laid down per original plans. They became second only to Seawise Giant (after its jumboisation) for deadweight tonnage and length overall.		
Esso Atlantic; Esso Pacific	406.57 m (1,334 ft)	516,421–516,891 DWT	247,160–247,161 GT	1977–2002	Broken up			
Nai Superba; Nai Genova	381.92 m (1,253 ft)	409,400 DWT		1978–2001	Broken up			
Berge Emperor; Berge Empress	381.82 m (1,253 ft)	423,745 DWT		1975–2004	Broken up			
TI class (4 ships)	380 m (1,247 ft)	441,893 DWT	234,006 GT	2002–	In service			

== Bulk carriers ==
Name	Length overall	DWT	GT/GRT	In service	Status	Notes	Image	Reference
Valemax (68 ships)	360–362 m (1,181–1,188 ft)	380,000–400,000 DWT	200,000 GT	2011–	In service	As of 2018, there are five different ship designs that are referred to as Valemax ships.		
Berge Stahl	342 m (1,122 ft)	364,767 DWT	175,720 GT	1986–2021	Broken up	Berge Stahl was the longest and largest bulk carrier in 1986–2011.		
Tubarao Maru; Brasil Maru; Global Harmony	340 m (1,115 ft)	327,095–327,180 DWT	160,774 GT	2007–	In service			
Ruhr Ore; Alster Ore	340 m (1,115 ft)	305,836–305,893 DWT	171,924 GT	1987–2011	Broken up			
Stellar Ace; Stellar Banner; Stellar Crown	340 m (1,115 ft)	300,660 DWT	151,596 GT	2015–	In service	Stellar Banner sank in 2020.		

== Container ships ==
Name	Length overall	DWT	Gross tonnage	In service	Status	Image	Ref
Ever Ace Ever Act Ever Aim Ever Alp Ever Alot Ever Arm Ever Art	399.9 m (1,312 ft)	235,579 DWT	235,579 GT	2021–	In service		
Barzan Al Muraykh Al Nefud Al Zubara Al Dahna Tihama	400 m (1,312 ft)	199,744 DWT	195,636 GT	2015–	In service		
MOL Triumph; MOL Trust; MOL Tribute; MOL Tradition	400 m (1,312 ft)	192,672 DWT	199,000 GT	2017–	In service		
MSC Diana; MSC Ingy; MSC Eloane; MSC Mirjam; MSC Rifaya; MSC Leanne	400 m (1,312 ft)	202,036 DWT	193,489 GT	2016–	In service		
MSC Anna; MSC Viviana	399.98 m (1,312 ft)	185,503 DWT	187,587 GT	2016–	In service		
Ever Golden; Ever Genius; Ever Gifted; Ever Glory; Ever Globe; Ever Goods; Ever Given; Ever Grade; Ever Gentle; Ever Govern; Ever Greet; MOL Treasure; MOL Truth	399.96 m (1,312 ft)	199,692 DWT	219,775 GT	2017–	In service		

== Passenger ships ==
Name	Length overall	Gross tonnage	In service	Status	Image	Ref
Icon Class (3 ships)	364 m (1,196 ft)	248,663–250,800 GT	2024–	In service		
Oasis class (5 ships)	360–362 m (1,181–1,188 ft)	225,282– 226,963 GT	2009–	In service		
Quantum class (5 ships)	347.06–348 m (1,139–1,142 ft)	168,666 GT	2014–	In service		
Queen Mary 2	345.03 m (1,132.0 ft)	148,527 GT	2003–	In service		
Iona	344.5 m (1,130.2 ft)	184,089 GT	2020–	In service		
Mardi Gras	344.4 m (1,130 ft)	181,808 GT	2020–	In service		

== Other ==
Other longest ships of their type.

Name	Type	Length overall	DWT	GT/GRT	In service	Status	Notes	Image	Ref
Pioneering Spirit	Crane vessel	382 m (1,253 ft)	499,125 DWT	403,342 GT	2015–	In service	Pioneering Spirit is the largest twin-hulled vessel ever built as well as, at 124 metres (407 ft), the widest ship in the world. Photo is prior to renaming of vessel.		
Q-Max (14 ships)	LNG carrier	345 m (1,132 ft)	128,900 DWT	163,922 GT	2008–	In service			
USS Enterprise	Aircraft carrier	342 m (1,122 ft)			1961–2013	Retired	USS Enterprise, the longest aircraft carrier ever built, was inactivated in December 2012.		
Paul R. Tregurtha	Lake freighter	309 m (1,014 ft)			1981–	In service	The current Queen of the Lakes (the longest ship operating on the Great Lakes), and last of the "1000-footers" launched there.		

== See also ==
- List of large sailing vessels
- List of large sailing yachts
- List of longest naval ships
- List of motor yachts by length
- Timeline of largest passenger ships
- List of longest wooden ships
- List of largest ships by gross tonnage
- Suezmax
- Panamax
- Malaccamax
- Baltimax
- Chinamax
- Q-Max
