= TI-class supertanker =

Supertanker class

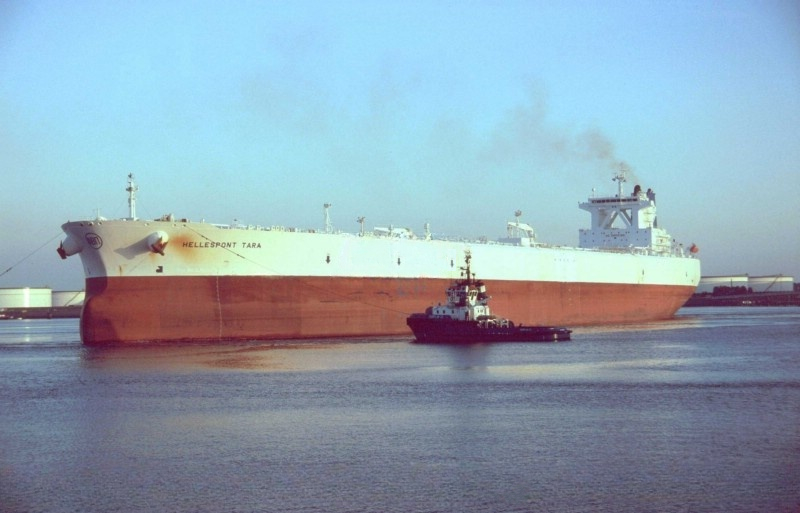
- Hellespont Tara (later TI Europe) in the Netherlands on 24 June 2005.

Class overview
- Builders: Daewoo Shipbuilding & Marine Engineering (Okpo, South Korea)
- Preceded by: Batillus-class supertanker
- Built: 2002–2003
- In service: 2002–present
- Completed: 4
- Active: 4

General characteristics
- Type: Ultra-large crude carrier
- Tonnage: 234,006 GT; 162,477 NT; 441,893 DWT
- Displacement: 67,591 tonnes (66,524 long tons; 74,506 short tons) unladen; 509,484 tonnes (501,437 long tons; 561,610 short tons) full load
- Length: 380 m (1,246 ft 9 in) o/a
- Beam: 68 m (223 ft 1 in)
- Draught: 24.5 m (80 ft 5 in)
- Speed: 16.5 kn (30.6 km/h; 19.0 mph) laden
- Capacity: 2,800,000 barrels (450,000 m^{3})
- Crew: 35-40

The TI class of supertankers comprises the ships TI Africa, TI Asia, TI Europe, and TI Oceania (names as of July 2004). The prefix "TI" refers to Tankers International, the ultra-large crude carrier (ULCC) pool operator. The class was the first group of ULCCs constructed in 25 years.

By displacement, deadweight tonnage (DWT), and gross tonnage (a measure of internal volume rather than mass), the TI class ships are exceeded only by the crane vessel Pioneering Spirit.

In comparison, the Triple E-class container ships are longer overall and have greater total cargo volume, including container capacity above deck.

The previous largest ship by length and displacement, the supertanker Seawise Giant, was dismantled in 2010.

== History ==
All four oil tankers were constructed for shipping company Hellespont Group by Daewoo Shipbuilding & Marine Engineering in Okpo, South Korea, entering service between March 2002 and April 2003. The ships were originally named Hellespont Alhambra, Hellespont Fairfax, Hellespont Metropolis and Hellespont Tara.

In 2004, Belgian shipowner Euronav NV and partners purchased all four ships. Hellespont Fairfax, Hellespont Tara, Hellespont Alhambra and Hellespont Metropolis were renamed TI Oceania, TI Europe, TI Asia and TI Africa respectively.

Hellespont Fairfax was the subject of The Discovery Channel's television show Superships, episode "Launching a Leviathan—Hellespont Fairfax".

Hellespont Metropolis cost $89 million in 2002, requiring 700,000 man-hours of direct labor.

== Features ==
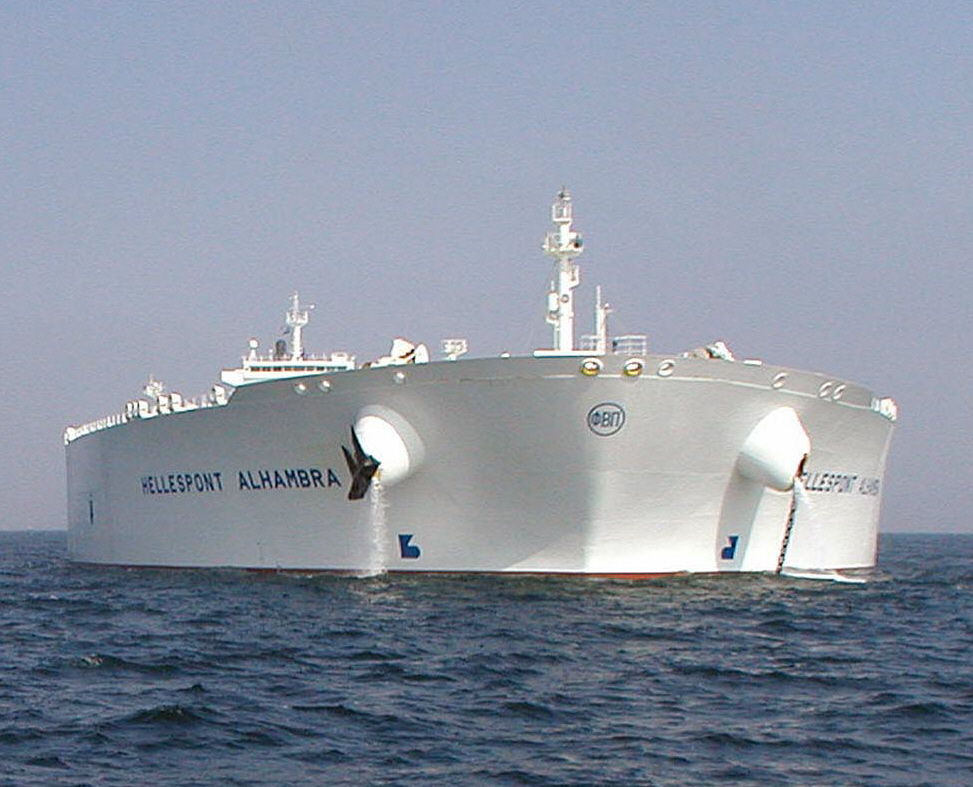
Hellespont Alhambra (later TI Asia) in the United States on 16 May 2002.

The class, each ship powered by a single HSD-Sulzer 9RTA84T-D delivering 50,220 brake horsepower (37,450 kW) at 76 rpm, possesses a relatively high service speed (16.5 knots; 30.6 km/h laden, 17.5 knots; 32.4 km/h in ballast), which increases their earning capacity. The steel scantlings are greater than the class minimum.

These ships are wider than the new Panama Canal locks. They also cannot travel through the Suez Canal unless on a ballast voyage.

The coatings in the ballast tanks are protected by two features, a full-time double-scrubbing system supplying drier inert gas to the ballast tanks, and also by the white painted upper hull reflecting the sun’s energy. The inert gas system also increases safety. Keeping down the cargo temperatures also minimizes hydrocarbon emissions.

== Conversion ==
In 2009 and 2010, TI Asia and TI Africa were converted into sophisticated floating storage and offloading (FSO) vessels, moored off the coast of Qatar in the Persian Gulf at the Al Shaheen Oil Field. The extensive conversions were carried out by EuroNav and Overseas Shipholding Group at Drydocks World – Dubai.

In 2017, TI Europe was chartered by Statoil and converted to an FSO vessel, moored at Port of Kuala Sungai Linggi in Malaysia. In 2019, it was announced that TI Oceania would be converted to an FSO vessel and moored off the coast of Singapore. As of April 2026, both vessels currently operate as FSO (Floating Storage and Offloading) units rather than active transport tankers currently anchored near Kukup, Malaysia, meaning they typically remain stationary for long periods to store oil.

Ships in class
No.	Ship	Flag	IMO number	Delivery	Status	Owner	Note
1	FSO Asia Previously TI Asia (7/2004–11/2009), Hellespont Alhambra (3/2002–7/2004)	Marshall Islands	9224752	March 2002	In service	Euronav	FSO located at Al Shaheen Oil Field
2	FSO Africa Previously TI Africa (7/2004–3/2010), Hellespont Metropolis (6/2002–7/2004)	Marshall Islands	9224764	June 2002	In service	Euronav	FSO located Al Shaheen Oil Field
3	SA Europe Previously Europe, TI Europe, Hellespont Tara (11/2002–7/2004)	The Bahamas	9235268	November 2002	In service	Minsheng Qihao (Tianjin) Shipping Leasing Co Ltd	FSO located at offshore of Kukup Island
4	SA Oceania Previously OCEANIA (7/2018–1/2024), Overseas Laura Lynn (?–7/2018), TI Oceania (7/2004–?), Hellespont Fairfax (4/2003–7/2004)	The Bahamas	9246633	April 2003	In service	Minsheng Qihao (Tianjin) Shipping Leasing Co Ltd	FSO located at offshore of Kukup Island

Information obtained from IMO GISIS Ship and Company Particulars, MarineTraffic, Euronav and branches, and Subsidiaries of International Seaways 15 February 2020, update Europe ship 8 August 2023, SA Oceania update 4 May 2024.

== See also ==
- List of world's longest ships
- Seawise Giant
- Batillus-class supertankers
