= Length overall =

Maximum length of a vessel's hull measured parallel to the waterline

LOA (length overall) & LWL (waterline length)

Detailed hull dimensions

Length overall (LOA, o/a, o.a. or oa) is the maximum length of a vessel's hull measured parallel to the waterline. This length is important while docking the ship. It is the most commonly used way of expressing the size of a ship, and is also used for calculating the cost of a marina berth (for example, £2.50 per metre LOA).

LOA is usually measured on the hull alone. For sailing ships, this may exclude the bowsprit and other fittings added to the hull. This is how some racing boats and tall ships use the term LOA. However, other sources may include bowsprits in LOA. Confusingly, LOA has different meanings. "Sparred length", "Total length including bowsprit", "Mooring length" and "LOA including bowsprit" are other expressions that might indicate the full length of a sailing ship.

== LOD ==
Often used to distinguish between the length of a vessel including projections (e.g. bow sprits, etc.) from the length of the hull itself, the Length on Deck or LOD is often reported. This is especially useful for smaller sailing vessels, as their LOA can be significantly different from their LOD.

== LOH ==
In ISO 8666 for small boats, there is a definition of LOH, or length of hull. This may be shorter than a vessel's LOA, because it excludes other parts attached to the hull, such as bowsprits.

== LWL ==
Another measure of length is LWL (loaded waterline length) which is more useful in assessing a vessel's performance. In some cases (particularly old yachts or vessels with bowsprits) LWL can be considerably shorter than LOA.

== See also ==
- The National Register of Historic Vessels
- Length between perpendiculars
- List of longest ships
