= HMM Copenhagen =

South Korean container ship

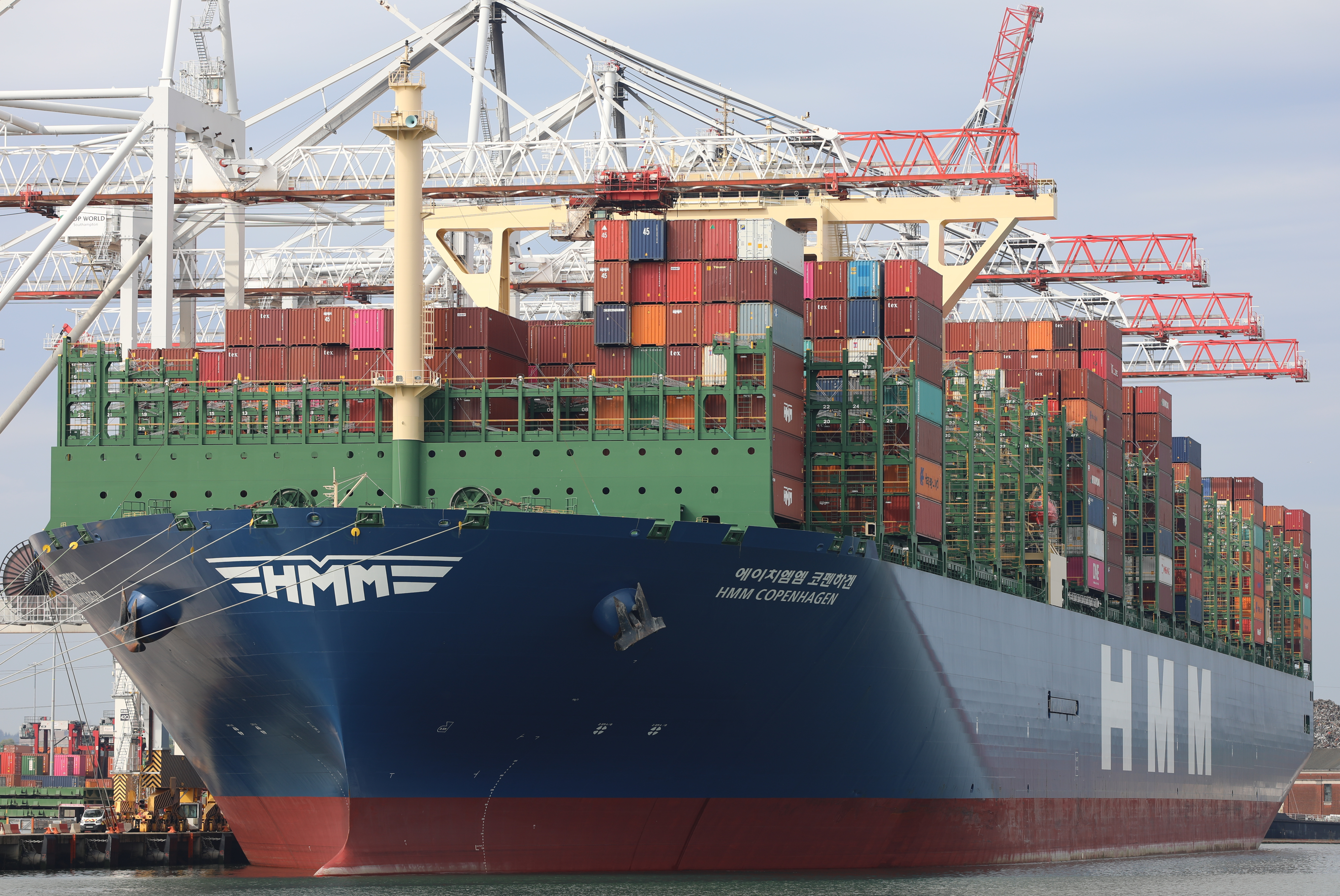
- HMM Copenhagen at Southampton container port

History
- Name: HMM Copenhagen
- Operator: HMM
- Builder: Daewoo Shipbuilding & Marine Engineering
- Yard number: 4319
- Launched: 21 May 2020
- Completed: 22 May 2020
- Identification: Call sign: 3EIO3; IMO number: 9863302; MMSI number: 356712000

General characteristics
- Class & type: HMM Algeciras-class container ship
- Type: Container ship
- Tonnage: 228,283 GT; 232,606 DWT
- Length: 399.9 m (1,312 ft 0 in)
- Beam: 61 m (200 ft 2 in)
- Draft: 16.525 m (54 ft 2.6 in)
- Propulsion: MAN Diesel & Turbo 11G95ME-C
- Capacity: 23,964 TEU

HMM Copenhagen is a large container ship built in 2020 by Daewoo Shipbuilding & Marine Engineering in South Korea. She is 61 metres (200 ft 2 in) wide and 399.9 metres (1,312 ft 0 in) long. The ship has a capacity of 23,964 TEU. HMM Copenhagen is registered in Panama and operated by HMM Co Ltd.
