= MSC Beatrice =

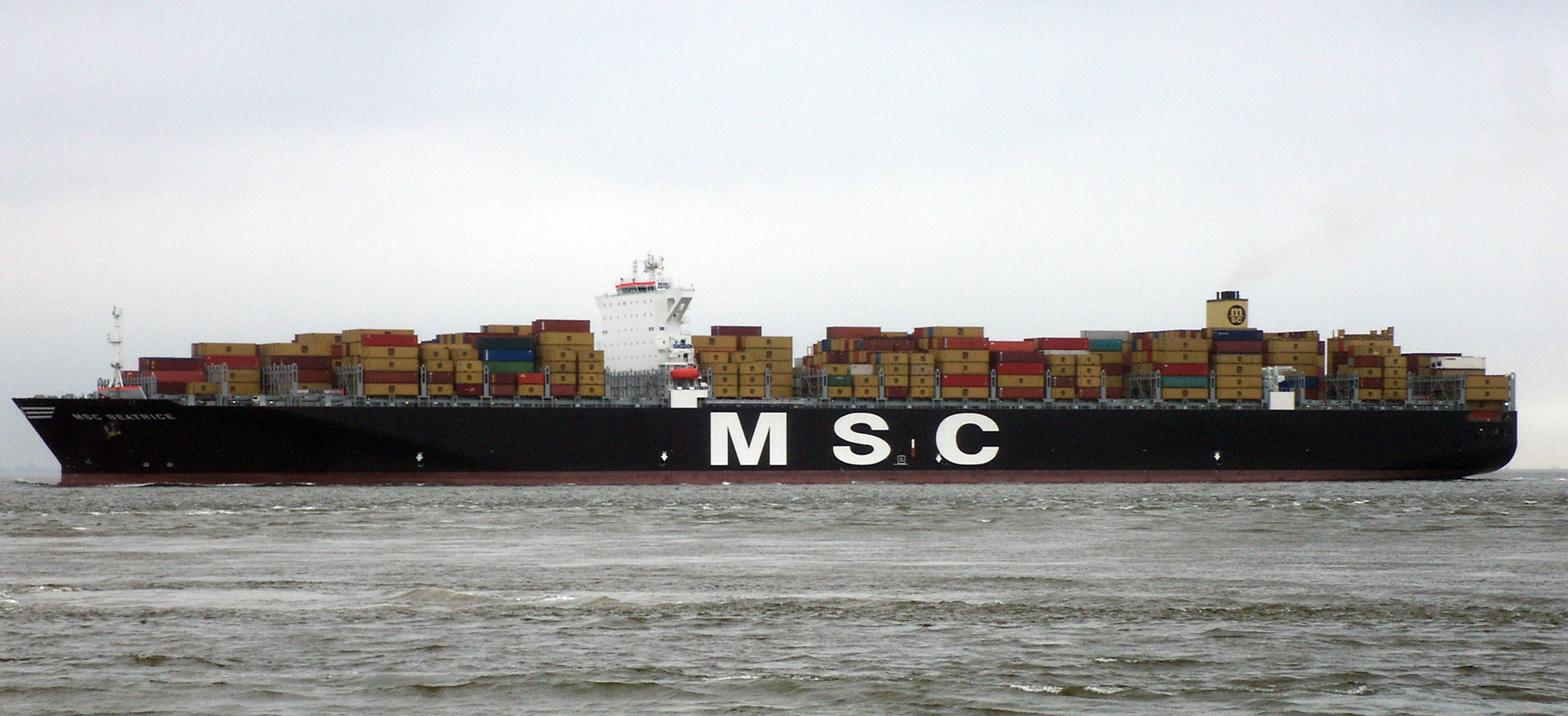
- MSC Beatrice

History
- Name: MSC Beatrice
- Owner: Mediterranean Shipping Company S.A.
- Operator: Mediterranean Shipping Company S.A.
- Port of registry: Panama
- Builder: Samsung Heavy Industries; South Korea
- Yard number: 1709
- In service: 2009 - present
- Identification: Call sign: 3FUF2; IMO number: 9399014; MMSI number: 353162000
- Status: In active service

General characteristics
- Class & type: MSC Daniela-class container ship
- Tonnage: 151,559 GT; 156,301 DWT
- Length: 366.1 m (1,201 ft 1 in)
- Beam: 51 m (167 ft 4 in)
- Draught: 15 m (49 ft 3 in)
- Propulsion: 72,240 kW (96,880 hp) MAN B&W 12K98MCC
- Speed: 25.2 knots (46.7 km/h; 29.0 mph)
- Capacity: 14000 TEU; 1000 TEU (Reefers)
- Crew: 30

MSC Beatrice is one of the largest container ships in the world. She has a maximum capacity of 13,798 twenty-foot equivalent units (TEU), or 10,500 TEU (14 tonnes each) and is 366 metres (1,200 ft 9 in) long. Because of her size, the deckhouse was moved forward. This solution increases container capacity and improves torsional strength.

She is the second of eight MSC Daniela-class vessels ordered from Samsung Heavy Industries, with another four class vessels ordered from Daewoo Shipbuilding & Marine Engineering (DSME), a company spun-off from Daewoo in 2000.

Despite her larger claimed capacity, MSC Beatrice is neither the longest container ship in the world, nor does it have the largest tonnage. With a length of nearly 400 metres (1,312 ft 4 in), the Triple E-class container ship Mærsk Mc-Kinney Møller is the longest container ship in the world, but Maersk, her Danish owners, using a different basis of calculating capacity, initially only claimed a 13,500 TEU, but now list a container carrying capacity of 18,000 TEU. Maersk Mc-Kinney Møller is the first of a class of 20 identical Triple E vessels.
