= HMM Algeciras =

South Korean container ship

History
- Name: HMM Algeciras
- Operator: HMM
- Builder: Daewoo Shipbuilding & Marine Engineering
- Yard number: 4318
- Launched: 23 April 2020
- Completed: 24 April 2020
- Identification: Call sign: 3EDF2; IMO number: 9863297; MMSI number: 351297000

General characteristics
- Class & type: HMM Algeciras-class container ship
- Type: Container ship
- Tonnage: 228,283 GT; 232,606 DWT
- Length: 399.9 m (1,312 ft 0 in)
- Beam: 61 m (200 ft 2 in)
- Draft: 16.525 m (54 ft 2.6 in)
- Propulsion: MAN Diesel & Turbo 11G95ME-C
- Capacity: 23,964 TEU

HMM Algeciras is one of the world's largest container ships. Built by Daewoo Shipbuilding & Marine Engineering in South Korea. It is 61 metres (200 ft 2 in) wide and 399.9 metres (1,312 ft 0 in) long. The ship has a capacity of 23,964 TEU. HMM Algeciras is registered in South Korea and operated by HMM Co Ltd.

The "HMM Algeciras" is, along her 6 sisters and 5 "step-sisters" ("HMM Oslo"-class), deployed on the FE4 service of THE ALLIANCE between Asia and Europe, having the largest capacity deployed. Port rotation Qingdao-Pusan-Ningbo-Shanghai-Yantian-Suez Canal-Algeciras-Rotterdam-Hamburg-Antwerp-Tangiers Med-Suez Canal-Singapore-Qingdao.

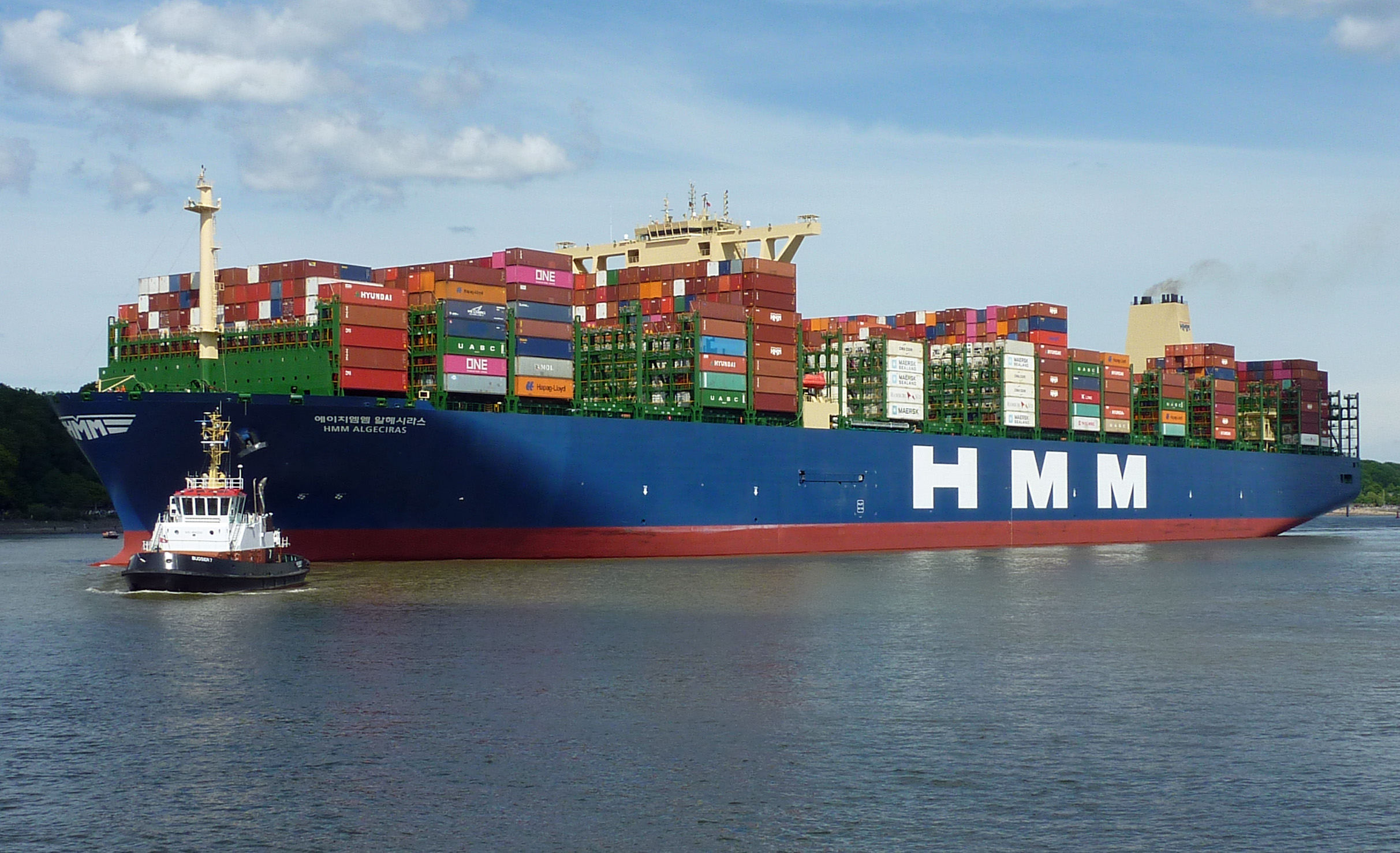

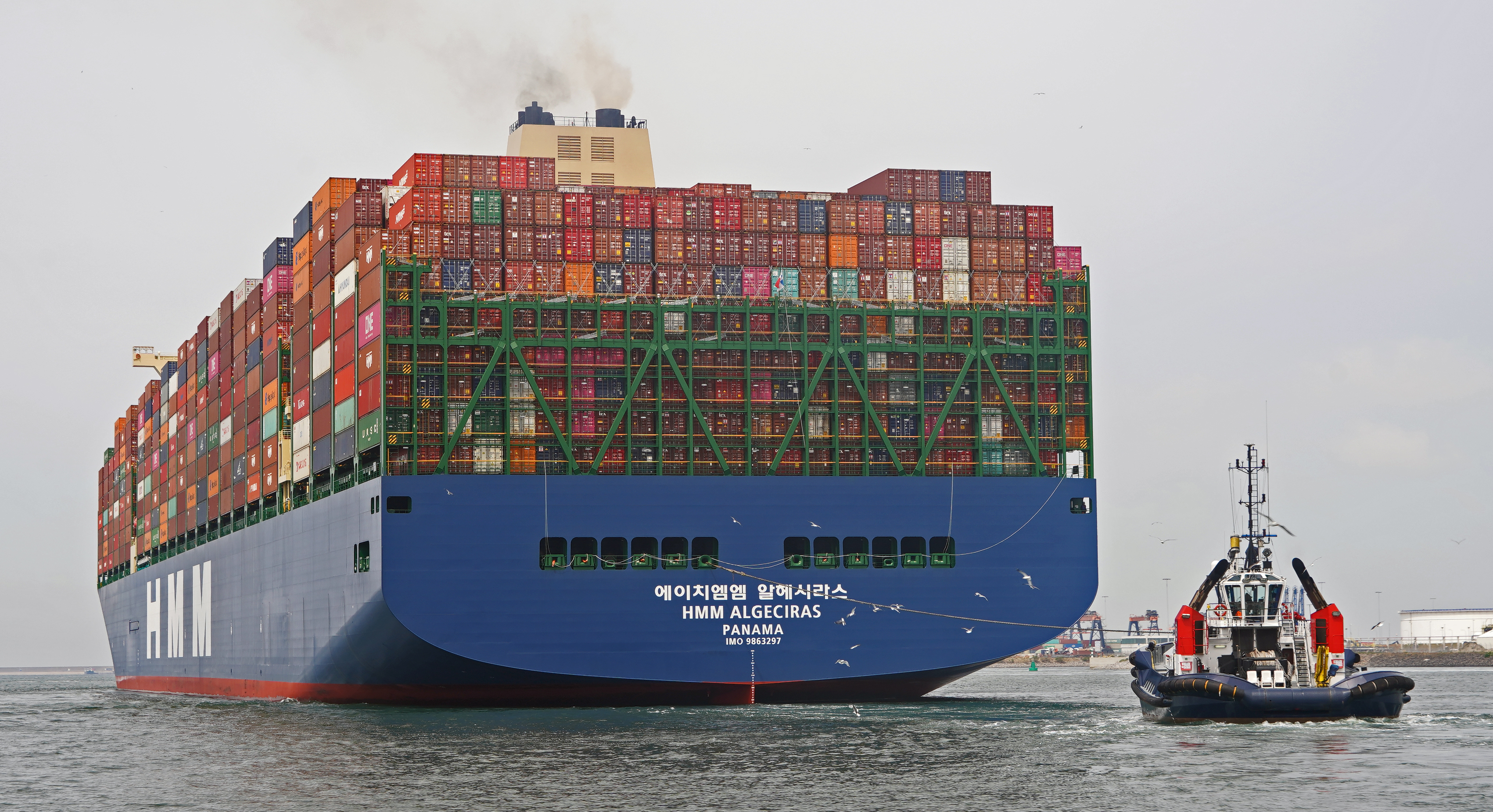
