= Daniela (disambiguation) =

Daniela is a female given name and a variant of Danielle.

Daniela may also refer to:

- Daniela (footballer) (born 1984), Brazilian footballer
- Daniela (grape), another name for the Italian wine grape Prié blanc
- Daniela (moth), a moth genus
- Daniela (1976 TV series), a Venezuelan telenovela
- Daniela (2002 TV series), an American-Mexican Spanish-language telenovela
- MSC Daniela, a Panamanian-registered container ship

== See also ==
- Cyclone Daniella, a 1996 Indian Ocean tropical cyclone
