= HMM Algeciras-class container ship =

Series of container ships

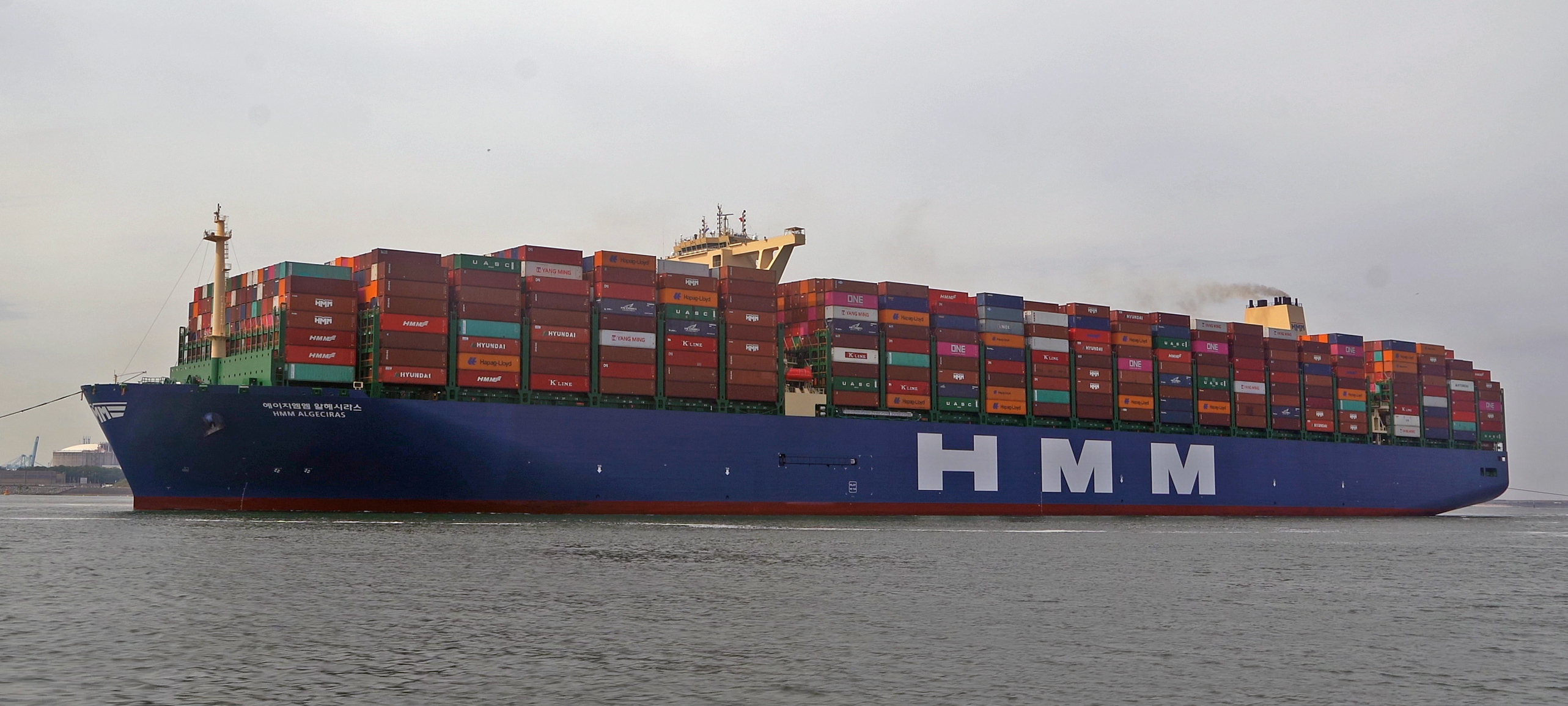
- HMM Algeciras entering the port of Rotterdam

Class overview
- Builders: Daewoo Shipbuilding & Marine Engineering and Samsung Heavy Industries
- Operators: HMM Co Ltd.
- In service: 2020–present
- Planned: 12
- Completed: 12
- Active: 12

General characteristics (DSME)
- Type: Container ship
- Tonnage: 228,283 GT
- Length: 399.9 m (1,312 ft 0 in)
- Beam: 61 m (200 ft 2 in)
- Draft: 16.525 m (54 ft 2.6 in)
- Propulsion: MAN Diesel & Turbo 11G95ME-C
- Capacity: 23,964 TEU

General characteristics (SHI)
- Type: Container ship
- Tonnage: 232,311 GT
- Length: 399.9 m (1,312 ft 0 in)
- Beam: 61.5 m (201 ft 9 in)
- Draft: 16.525 m (54 ft 2.6 in)
- Propulsion: MAN Diesel & Turbo 11G95ME-C
- Capacity: 23,820 TEU

The Algeciras class is a class of container ships consisting of 12 vessels built for HMM. The largest ships have a maximum theoretical capacity of 23,964 twenty-foot equivalent units (TEU). They were the largest container ships in the world when they were delivered, surpassing the previous Gülsün class (23,756 TEU). They have since been surpassed by the Ever Ace (23,992 TEU).

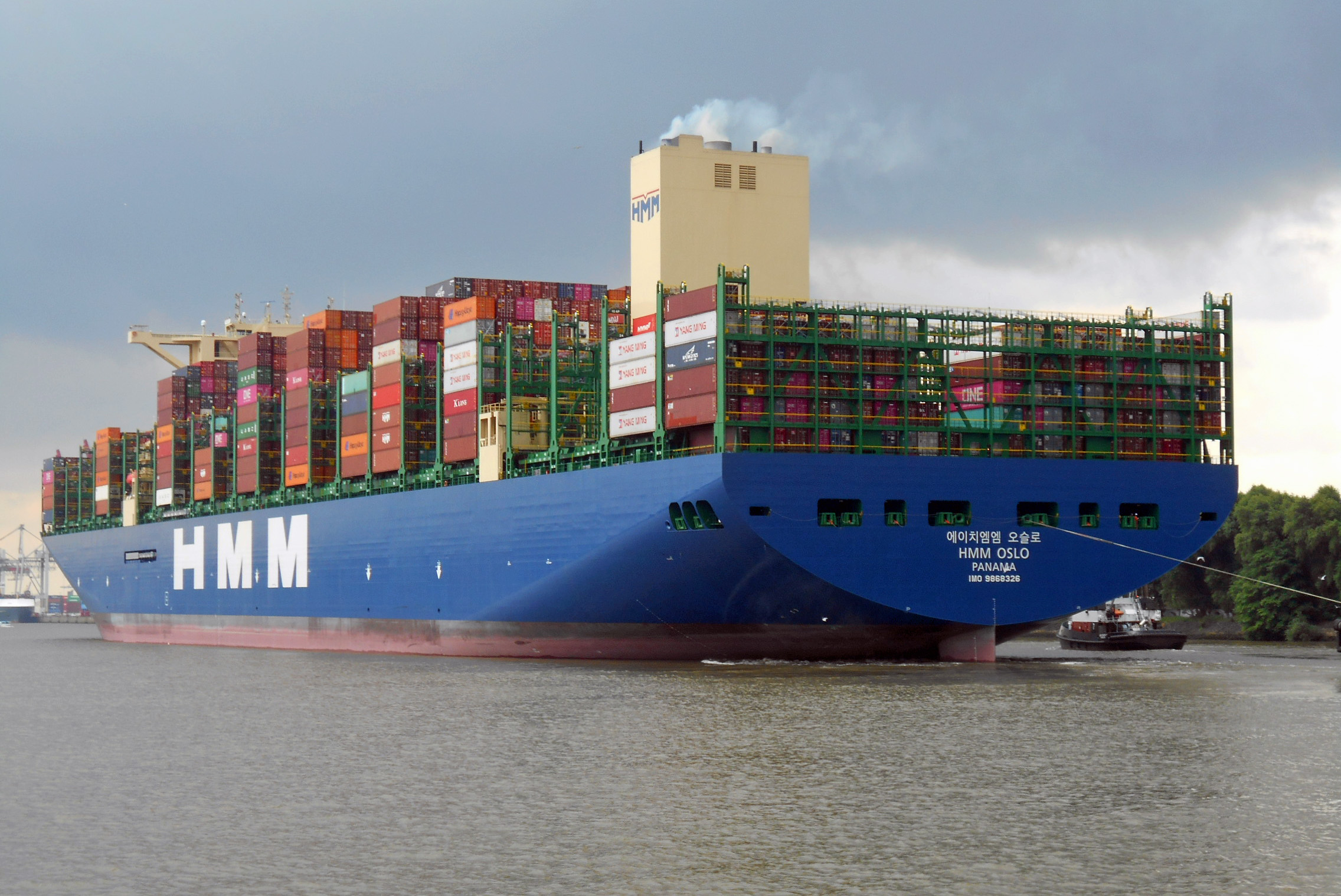
HMM Oslo in Hamburg, 2020

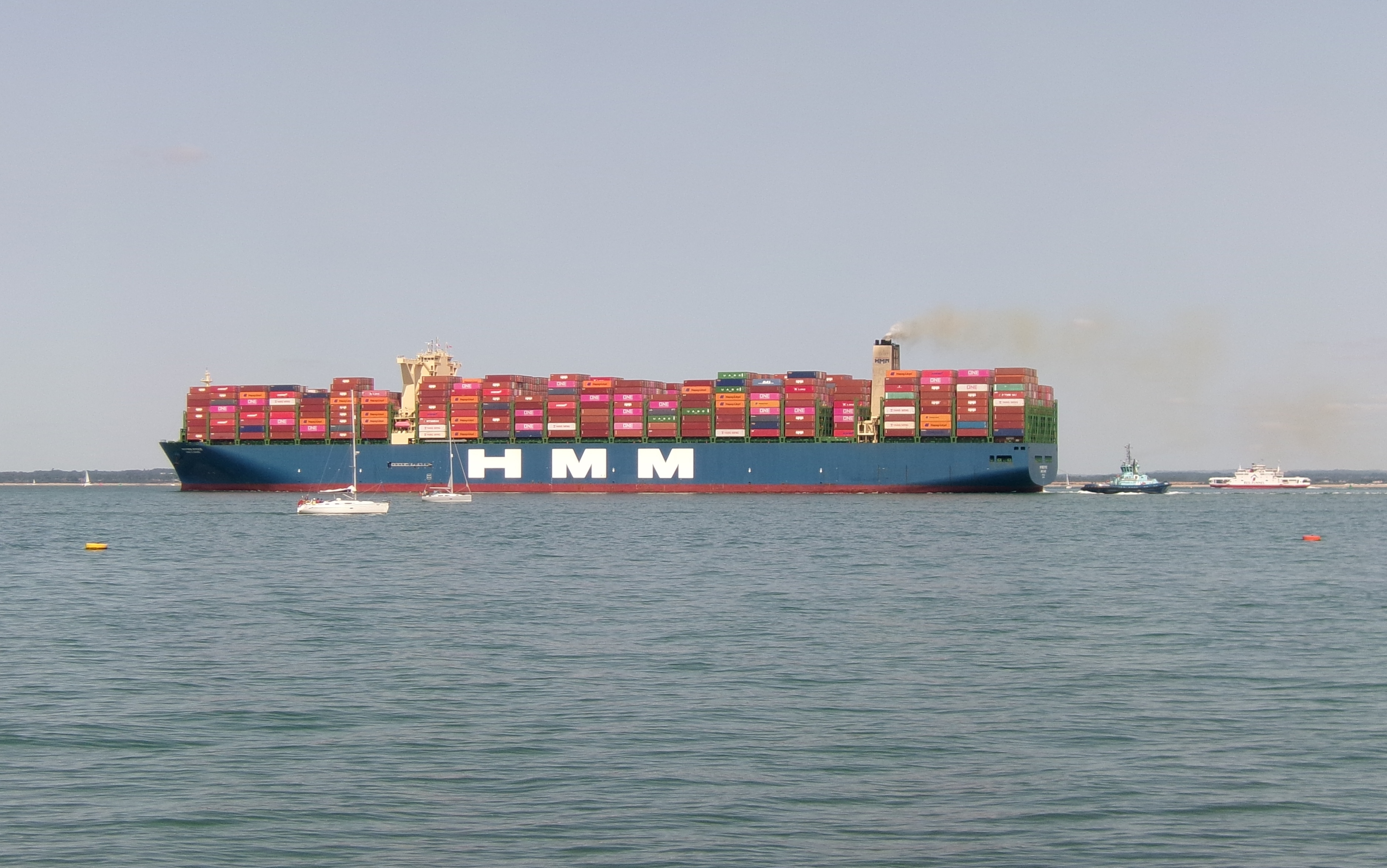
HMM Le Havre in the Solent, England, en route to Southampton container port.

== List of ships ==
Ship	Yard number	IMO number	Delivery	Status	Flag	ref
Daewoo Shipbuilding and Marine Engineering (23964TEU)
HMM Algeciras	4318	9863297	24 April 2020	In service	South Korea	
HMM Copenhagen	4319	9863302	22 May 2020	In service	South Korea	
HMM Dublin	4320	9863314	29 May 2020	In service	South Korea	
HMM Gdansk	4321	9863326	12 June 2020	In service	South Korea	
HMM Hamburg	4322	9863338	3 July 2020	In service	South Korea	
HMM Helsinki	4323	9863340	17 July 2020	In service	South Korea	
HMM Le Havre	4324	9868314	28 August 2020	In service	South Korea	
Samsung Heavy Industries (23820 TEU)
HMM Oslo	2288	9868326	8 May 2020	In service	South Korea	
HMM Rotterdam	2289	9868338	26 June 2020	In service	South Korea	
HMM Southampton	2290	9868340	31 July 2020	In service	South Korea	
HMM Stockholm	2291	9868352	7 August 2020	In service	South Korea	
HMM St Petersburg	2292	9868364	11 September 2020	In service	South Korea	

== See also ==
- Evergreen A-class: The world's largest container ship class, since 30 July 2021
- HMM Nuri-class container ship
- Hyundai Dream-class container ship
- Hyundai Together-class container ship
- Hyundai Earth-class container ship
