= MOL Presence =

History
- Name: MOL Presence
- Operator: Mitsui O.S.K. Lines
- Port of registry: Singapore
- Launched: 27 November 2007
- Identification: Call sign: 9V8990; IMO number: 9444273; MMSI number: 564803000
- Status: In service

General characteristics
- Type: Container ship
- Tonnage: 71,776 GT; 72,912 DWT
- Length: 293.2 m (962 ft)
- Beam: 40 m (130 ft)
- Draught: 14.0 m (45.9 ft)
- Depth: 24.3 m (80 ft)
- Installed power: Mitsui MAN B&W 11K98MC (84,350 hp)
- Speed: 27 knots (50 km/h; 31 mph) (maximum) 26 knots (48 km/h; 30 mph) (cruising)
- Capacity: 6,350 TEU

MOL Presence is a container ship, operated by Mitsui O.S.K. Lines. The cargo ship was built in 2008 at Koyo Dockyard in Mihara, Japan. The ship has total capacity for 6,350 TEU at 16 rows with 500 reefer plugins.

== Design ==
The container ship MOL Presence has overall length 293.2 m (962 ft), beam 40 m (130 ft), depth 24.3 m (80 ft) and summer draft 14.0 m (45.9 ft). The deadweight of MOL Presence is 72,912 DWT and the gross tonnage is 71,776 GT. With this size the ship can carry total 6,350 TEU (2,912 TEU in the holds and 3,438 TEU on the deck).

== Engineering ==
MOL Presence has main engine MAN B&W 11K98MC. The total output power of the aggregate is 84,350 hp, achieved at 94 rpm. That power is enough for the ship to reach service (economy) speed of 26.0 kn.

== Registry ==
MOL Presence is owned and managed by the Mitsui O.S.K. Lines. The ship operated at the flag of Singapore. The IMO number is 9444273, the MMSI is 564803000 and the call sign is 9V8990.

== See also ==
- Hyundai Pride
