= Together-class container ship =

Container ship class

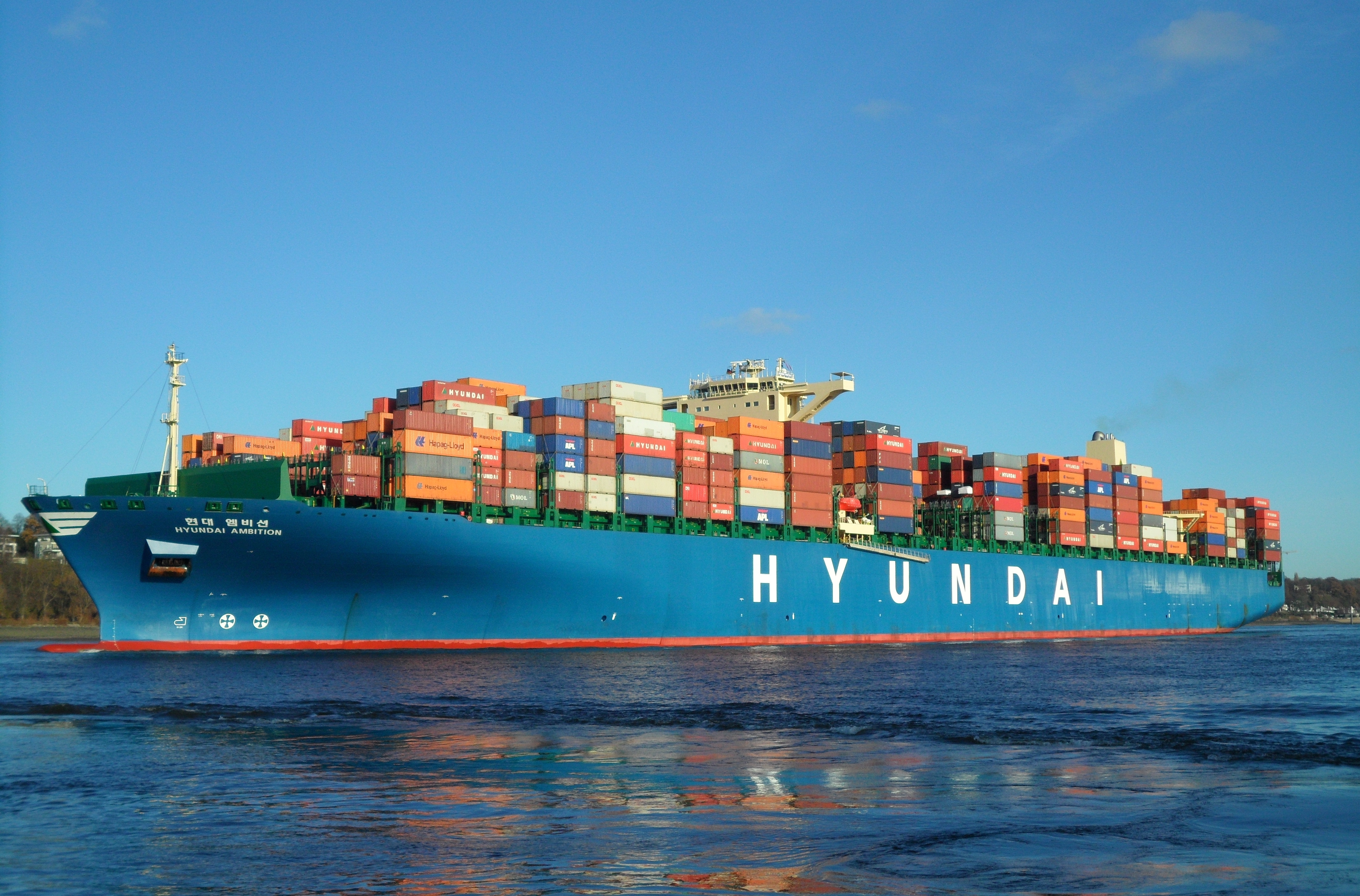
- Hyundai Ambition leaving the port of Hamburg

Class overview
- Builders: Hyundai Samho Heavy Industries
- Operators: Pacific International Lines Maersk Line
- In service: 2012–present
- Planned: 5
- Building: 0
- Completed: 5
- Active: 5

General characteristics
- Type: Container ship
- Tonnage: 141,770 GT
- Length: 366.5 m (1,202 ft)
- Beam: 48.2 m (158 ft)
- Draught: 15.5 m (51 ft)
- Capacity: 13,082 TEU

The Together class is a series of five container ships built for Danaos Corporation and operated by HMM. The ships have a maximum theoretical capacity of 13,082 TEU. The ships were built by Hyundai Samho Heavy Industries in South Korea.

== List of ships ==
Ship	Previous names	Yard number	IMO number	Delivery	Status	ref
Hyundai Honour	Hyundai Together (2012–2017)	S456	9473731	16 February 2012	In service	
Hyundai Respect	Hyundai Tenacity (2012–2017)	S457	9475674	8 March 2012	In service	
Hyundai Smart	Hyundai Smart (2012–2017); Maersk Enping (2017–2020)	S458	9475686	3 May 2012	In service	
Hyundai Speed	Hyundai Speed (2012–2017); Maersk Exeter (2017–2020)	S459	9475698	7 June 2012	In service	
Hyundai Ambition	Hyundai Ambition (2012–2017); MSC Ambition (2017–2020)	S460	9475703	29 June 2012	In service	

== See also ==
- HMM Algeciras-class container ship
- Nuri-class container ship
- Dream-class container ship
- Earth-class container ship
