= MSC Daniela =

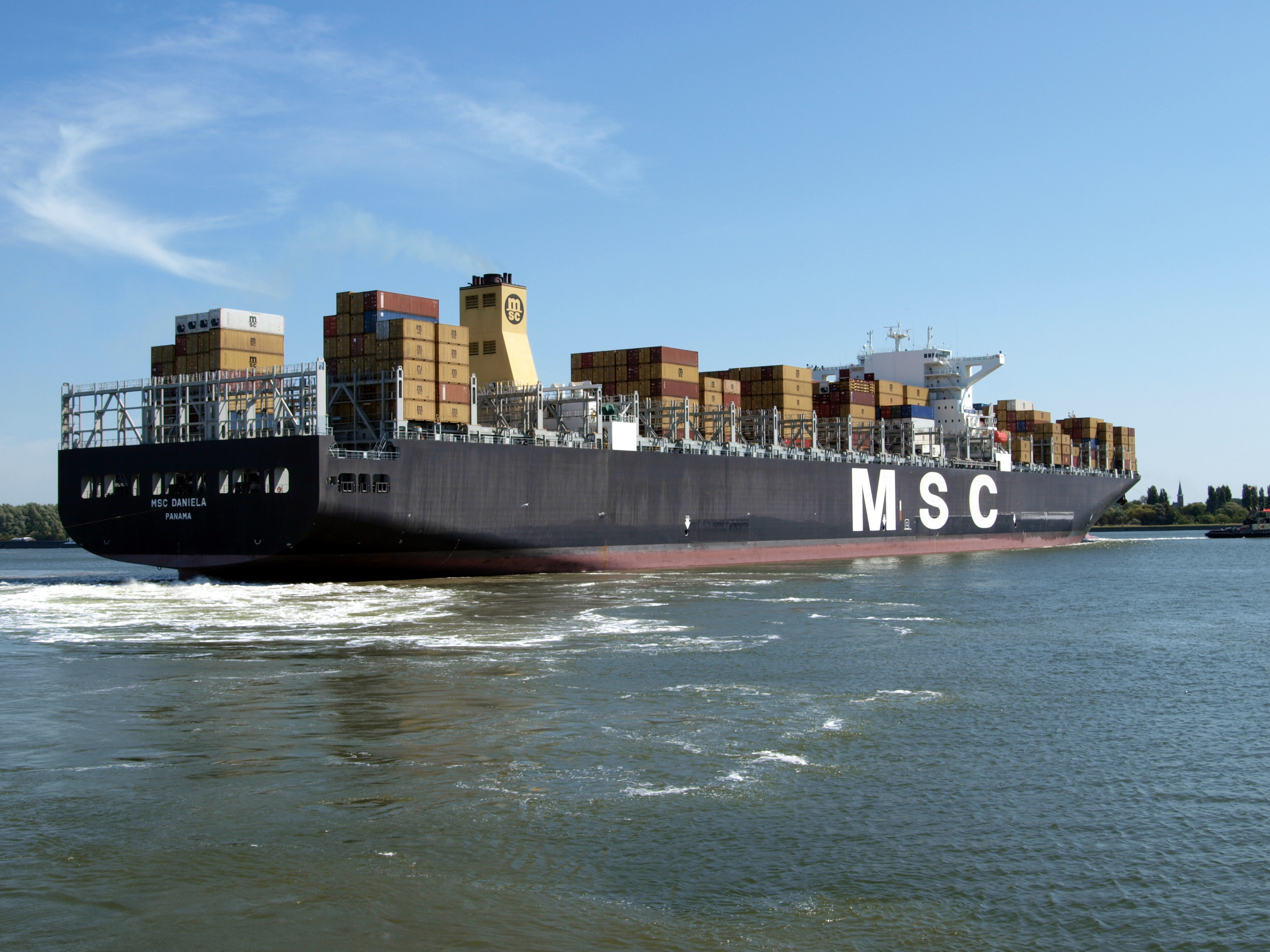
- MSC Daniela

History
- Name: MSC Daniela
- Operator: Mediterranean Shipping Company S.A.
- Port of registry: Panama
- Ordered: 1 July 2006
- Builder: Samsung Heavy Industries; Geoje, South Korea
- Yard number: 1708
- Launched: 2008
- Identification: Call sign: 3FIA2; IMO number: 9399002; MMSI number: 370892000

General characteristics
- Class & type: MSC Daniela-class container ship
- Tonnage: 165,000 DWT; 151,559 GT
- Length: 366 m (1,200 ft 9 in)
- Beam: 51 m (167 ft 4 in)
- Draft: 15 m (49 ft 3 in)
- Propulsion: MAN SE B&W 12K98MC-C diesel engine; 73,290 kilowatts (98,280 hp)
- Speed: 25.2 knots (46.7 km/h; 29.0 mph) (maximum)
- Capacity: 14,000 TEU
- Crew: 30

MSC Daniela is the lead ship of her class of container ship operated by the Mediterranean Shipping Company that at 366 metres (1,200 ft 9 in) is one of the largest container ships of the world, with a twenty-foot equivalent unit (TEU) cargo capacity of 14,000 containers. The building of MSC Daniela was started on 1 July 2006 and finished at the end of 2008; the ship was subsequently crowned as the largest according to cargo capacity. The shipbuilder was Samsung Heavy Industries in Geoje, South Korea.

However, MSC Daniela is now neither the longest container ship in the world, nor does it have the largest tonnage.

== Design ==
MSC Daniela has an overall length of 366 metres (1,200 ft 9 in), a moulded beam of 51 metres (167 ft 4 in) and draft, when the ship is fully loaded of 15 metres (49 ft 3 in). The deadweight tonnage (DWT) of the vessel is 165,000 metric tons and the gross tonnage (GT) is 135,000 gross tons. The ship is large and requires a strong and reliable engine. Powered by a MAN SE B&W 12K98MC-C diesel engine with total output of 73,290 kilowatts (98,280 hp), the vessel is able to realize a maximum speed of 25.2 knots (46.7 km/h; 29.0 mph), while the cruising speed is 23.5 knots (43.5 km/h; 27.0 mph).

== Operational history ==
In April 2017, MSC Daniela suffered extensive damage when a container caught fire approximately 120 miles (190 km) off Colombo. Firefighting efforts were coordinated by the Sri Lankan Navy and Colombo Port Authority which evacuated her crew and returned the ship safely to port. The ship was repaired jointly by the CIC Changxing Shipyard and COSCO Qidong Offshore and was successfully redelivered to MSC in late August.

== See also ==
- Emma Maersk
- CMA CGM Thalassa
- Gudrun Mærsk
- COSCO Guangzhou
- MSC Madeleine
