= Hyundai Brave =

Container ship built in 2008

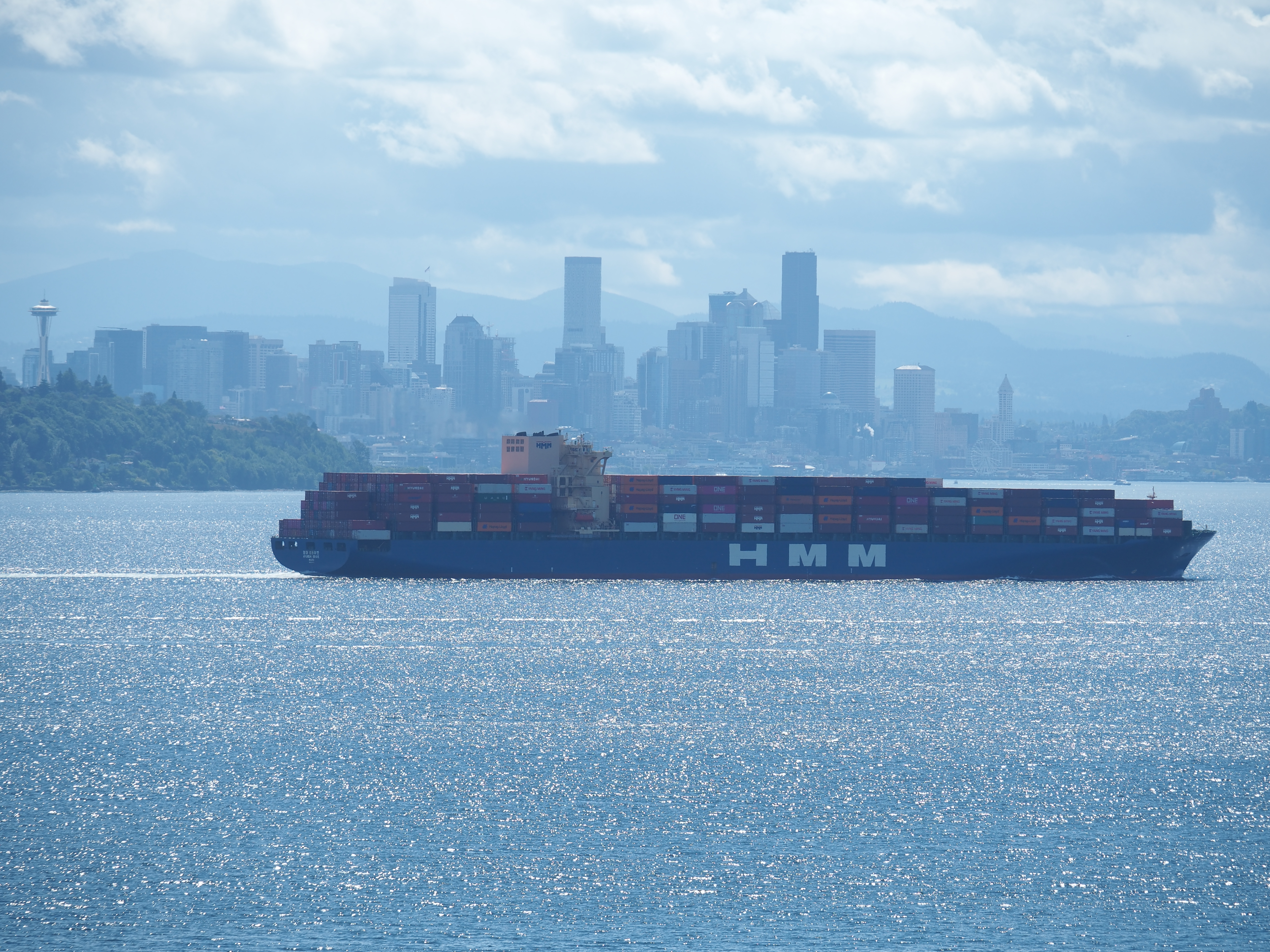
- MV Hyundai Brave in Seattle

History
- Name: Hyundai Brave
- Owner: KSF 10 International SA
- Operator: Hyundai Merchant Marine Co Ltd (HMM)
- Port of registry: Panama
- Builder: Hyundai Heavy Industries Co Ltd
- Yard number: 1810
- Launched: 31 August 2007
- Completed: January 2008
- Identification: IMO number: 9346304; Call sign: 3EMZ5; MMSI number: 371219000; Official No: 3347008
- Status: In service

General characteristics
- Class & type: KR (NV)
- Tonnage: 94,511 gt; 99,000 DWT
- Length: 339 m (1,112 ft)
- Beam: 46 m (151 ft)
- Draught: 15 m (49 ft)
- Depth: 25 m (82 ft)
- Decks: 1
- Installed power: 80,111kW (108,919hp)
- Propulsion: 1 oil engine
- Speed: 27.5kn
- Capacity: 8,600 TEU

The Hyundai Brave is a container ship built by Hyundai Heavy Industries Co Ltd, owned by KSF 10 International SA and operated by Hyundai Merchant Marine Co Ltd (HMM). This ship is registered in Panama.

== Hull and engine ==
The Hyundai Brave was built by Hyundai Heavy Industries Co Ltd in yard 1810 and was completed in January 2008. This ship is a fully cellular container ship with a total of 8,566 TEU carrying capacity. The ship is 334m in total length, 46m across the beam, 15m in draught, and 25m in depth. This container ship has only one deck.

The Hyundai Brave is powered by a Wärtsilä engine, producing a total power of 80,111 kW (108,919 hp) driving one propeller, and is capable is traveling at 27.5 kn. The engine is a 2 stroke, 14 cylinder engine and utilizes four 3,300 kW auxiliary generators. This powerful engine was built by Hyundai Heavy Industries Co Ltd in South Korea. The largest diesel engine in the world, a MAN B&W K98MCC 14-cylinder, rated at 80.1 megawatts (107,400 shp), powers the ship at speeds of up to 27 knots (50 km/h).

== News ==
In 2008 the Hyundai Brave was the first new ship added to the Hyundai Merchant Marine to serve in the French Asia Line. It was estimated to transfer 155 containers per hour from dock to ship. Just in 2011 alone the Hyundai Brave was in over 100 different ports.
