= Dream-class container ship =

South Korean container ship design

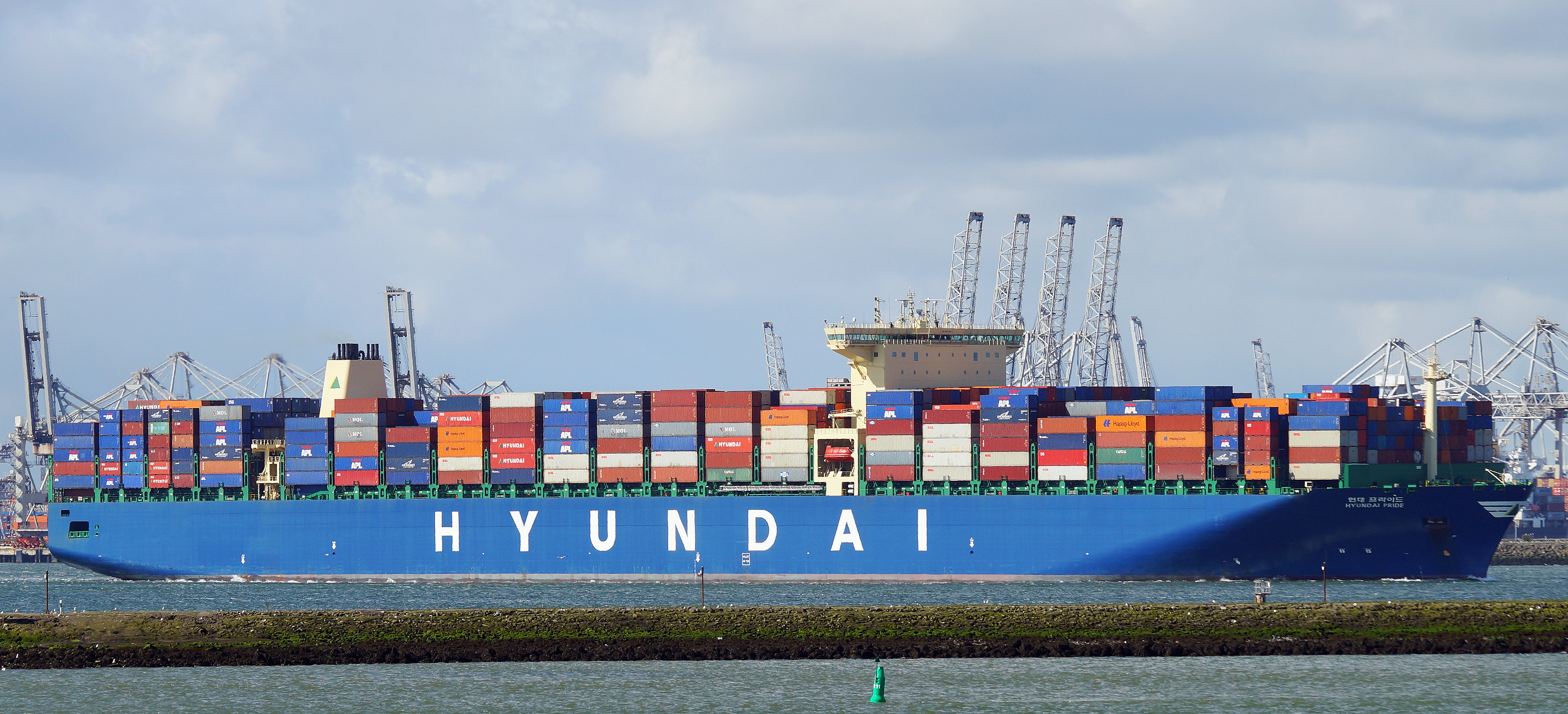
- Hyundai Pride in the port of Rotterdam

Class overview
- Builders: Daewoo Shipbuilding and Marine Engineering
- Operators: HMM
- In service: 2014–present
- Planned: 5
- Building: 0
- Completed: 5
- Active: 5

General characteristics
- Type: Container ship
- Tonnage: 142,620 GT
- Length: 365.5 m (1,199 ft)
- Beam: 48.4 m (159 ft)
- Draught: 15.52 m (50.9 ft)
- Capacity: 13,154 TEU

The Dream class is a series of five container ships built for HMM. The ships have a maximum theoretical capacity of 13,154 TEU. The ships were built by Daewoo Shipbuilding and Marine Engineering in South Korea.

== List of ships ==
Ship	Yard number	IMO number	Delivery	Status	ref
Hyundai Dream	4272	9637222	28 February 2014	In service	
Hyundai Hope	4273	9637234	7 March 2014	In service	
Hyundai Drive	4274	9637246	20 June 2014	In service	
Hyundai Victory	4275	9637258	4 July 2014	In service	
Hyundai Pride	4276	9637260	28 July 2014	In service	

== See also ==
- HMM Algeciras-class container ship
- Nuri-class container ship
- Together-class container ship
- Earth-class container ship
