= Daniela-class container ship =

Container ship class

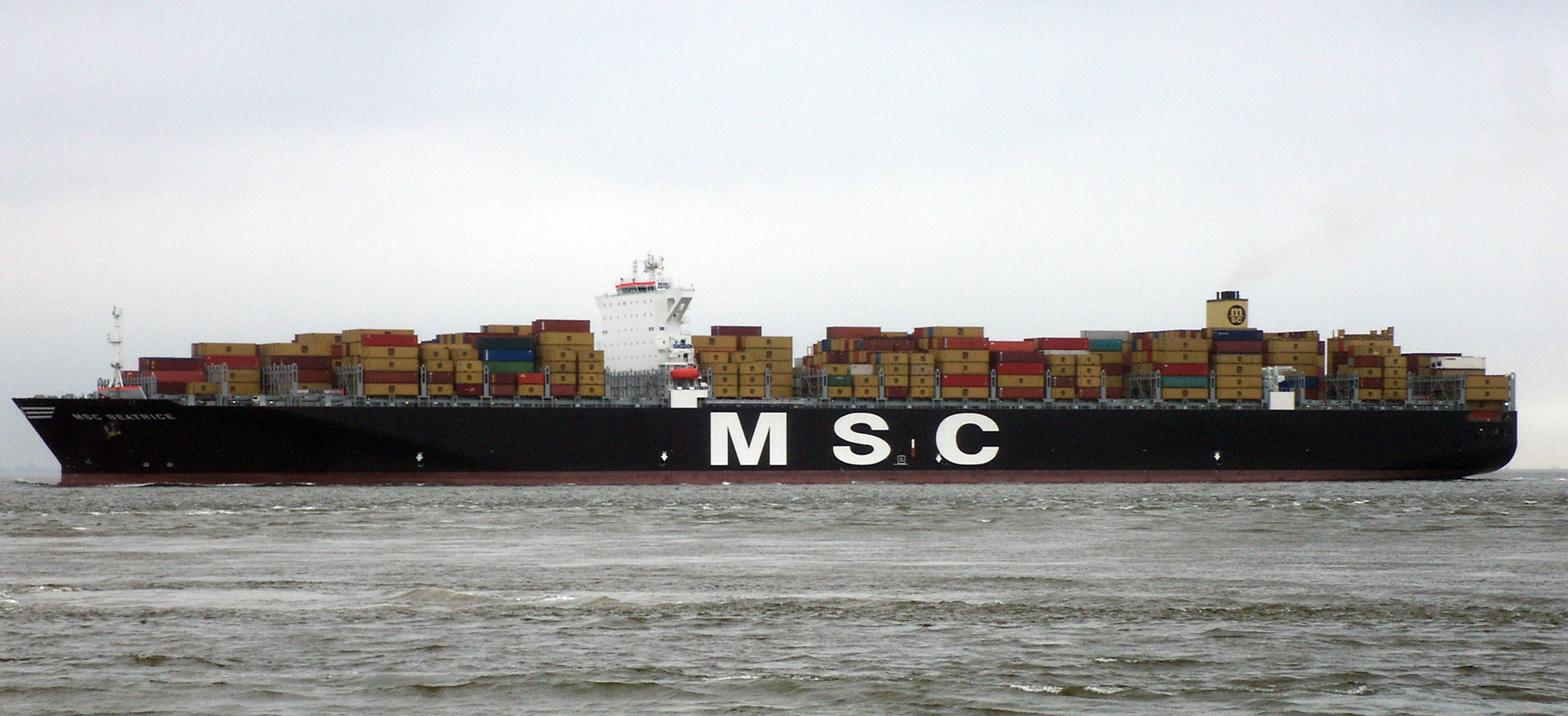
- MSC Beatrice in the port of Rotterdam

Class overview
- Builders: Samsung Heavy Industries
- Operators: Mediterranean Shipping Company
- In service: 2008–present
- Planned: 8
- Completed: 8
- Active: 8

General characteristics
- Type: Container ship
- Tonnage: 151,559 GT
- Length: 366.1 m (1,201 ft 1 in)
- Beam: 51.2 m (168 ft 0 in)
- Draught: 15.6 m (51 ft 2 in)
- Capacity: 13,798 TEU

The Daniela class is a series of eight container ships operated by Mediterranean Shipping Company and built by Samsung Heavy Industries in South Korea. The ships have a maximum theoretical capacity of 13,798 twenty-foot equivalent units (TEU).

== 2017 MSC Daniela fire ==
On 4 April 2017 a fire broke out in one of the containers onboard of MSC Daniela while the ship was on route from Singapore to the Suez Canal. After the fire was put out the remaining containers were offloaded in the port of Colombo. On 22 May she arrived in Shanghai for repairs that were initially expected to only take around three weeks. Eventually it would be almost eleven weeks before she could enter into service again, four months after the initial fire broke out.

== List of ships ==
Ship	Yard number	IMO number	Delivery	Status	ref
MSC Daniela	1708	9399002	15 December 2008	In service	
MSC Beatrice	1709	9399014	4 March 2009	In service	
MSC Kalina	1710	9399026	15 June 2009	In service	
MSC Bettina	1711	9399038	8 July 2010	In service	
MSC Irene	1712	9399040	8 July 2010	In service	
MSC Emanuela	1713	9399052	16 September 2010	In service	
MSC Eva	1714	9401130	16 September 2010	In service	
MSC Gaia	1715	9401142	11 October 2010	In service	
