= Earth-class container ship =

Class of container ship

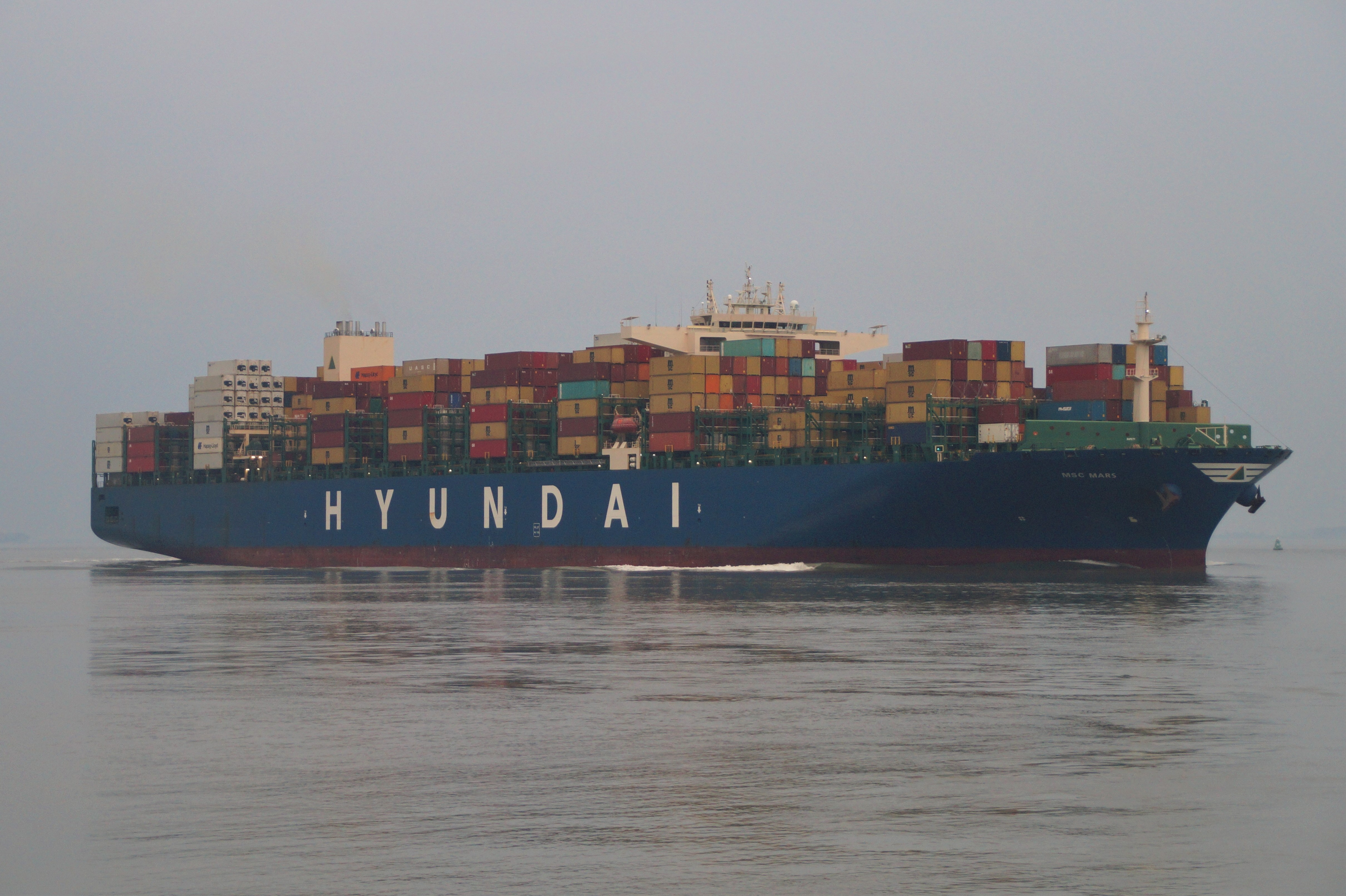
- Hyundai Mars as MSC Mars on Western Scheldt.

Class overview
- Builders: Daewoo Shipbuilding and Marine Engineering
- Operators: HMM
- In service: 2016–present
- Planned: 6
- Completed: 6
- Active: 6

General characteristics
- Type: Container ship
- Tonnage: 110,632 GT
- Length: 324 m (1,063 ft)
- Beam: 48.4 m (159 ft)
- Draught: 15.5 m (51 ft)
- Capacity: 10,077 TEU

The Earth class is a series of six container ships built for Zodiac Maritime and chartered to HMM for a period of 12 years. The ships have a maximum theoretical capacity of 10,077 TEU. The ships were built by Daewoo Shipbuilding and Marine Engineering in South Korea.

== List of ships ==
Ship	Previous names	Yard number	IMO number	Delivery	Status	ref
Hyundai Earth	Hyundai Earth (2016–2017); MSC Earth (2017–2020)	4290	9725110	21 January 2016	In service	
Hyundai Mars	Hyundai Mars (2016–2017); MSC Mars (2017–2020)	4291	9725122	26 February 2016	In service	
Hyundai Jupiter	Hyundai Jupiter (2016–2017); Maersk Suzhou (2017–2020)	4292	9725134	21 March 2016	In service	
Hyundai Saturn	Hyundai Saturn (2016–2017); MSC Saturn (2017–2020)	4293	9725146	16 May 2016	In service	
Hyundai Neptune	Hyundai Neptune (2016–2017); Maersk Shanghai (2017–2020)	4294	9725158	29 June 2016	In service	
Hyundai Pluto	Hyundai Pluto (2016–2017); Maersk Shenzen (2017–2020)	4295	9725160	6 July 2016	In service	

== See also ==
- HMM Algeciras-class container ship
- Nuri-class container ship
- Dream-class container ship
- Together-class container ship
