= CMA CGM Vela-class container ship =

Container ship class

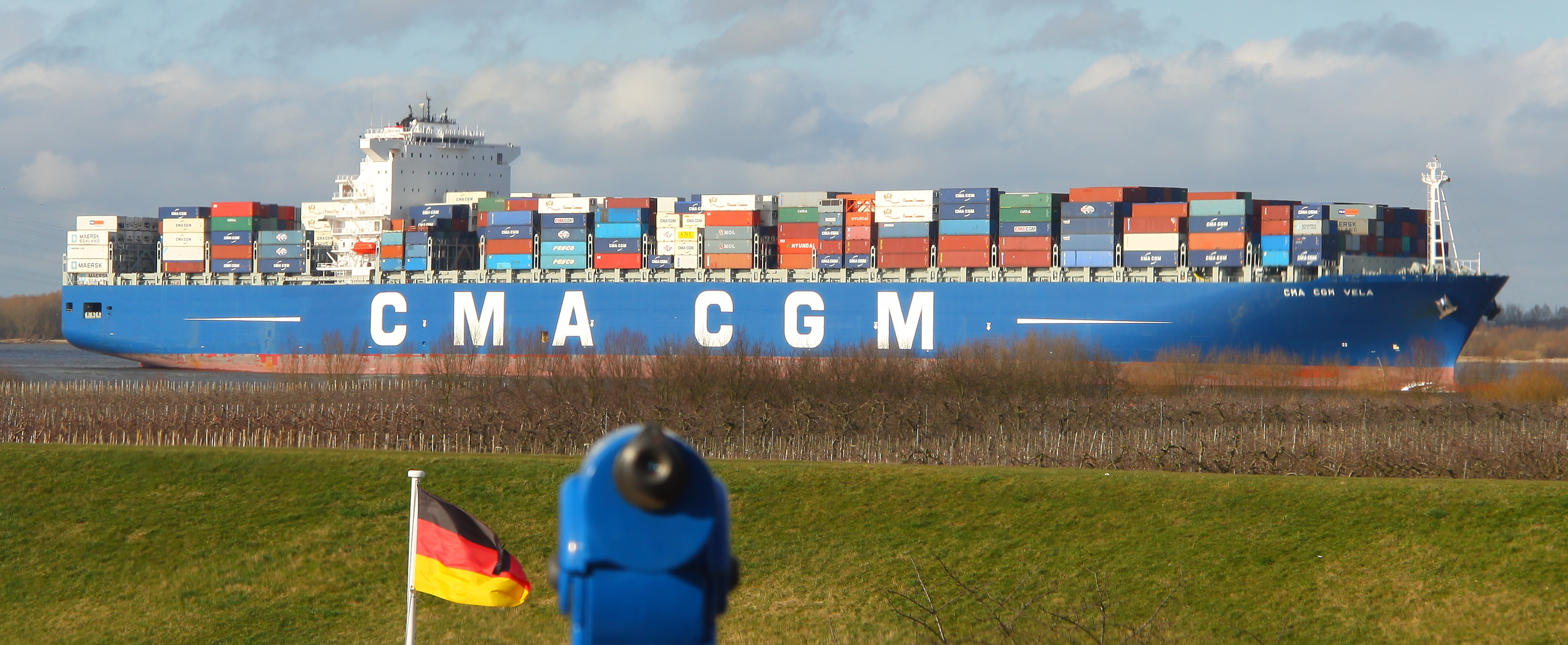
- CMA CGM Vela on the Elbe

Class overview
- Name: Vela-class
- Builders: Daewoo Shipbuilding and Marine Engineering
- Operators: CMA CGM
- In service: 2008–present
- Planned: 4
- Completed: 4
- Active: 4

General characteristics
- Type: Container ship
- Tonnage: 128,600 GT
- Length: 347.48 m (1,140 ft)
- Beam: 45.2 m (148 ft)
- Draught: 15.5 m (51 ft)
- Propulsion: one propeller, diesel
- Speed: 24.3 kn (cruising) 24.8 kn (maximum)
- Capacity: 11,262 TEU

The Vela class is a series of 4 container ships built for CMA CGM. The ships were built by Daewoo Shipbuilding and Marine Engineering in South Korea. The ships have a maximum theoretical capacity of around 11,262 twenty-foot equivalent units (TEU).

== List of ships ==
Ship	Yard number	IMO number	Delivery	Status	ref
CMA CGM Vela	4125	9354923	17 October 2008	In service	
CMA CGM Thalassa	4126	9356294	30 December 2008	In service	
CMA CGM Hydra	4127	9356309	8 April 2009	In service	
CMA CGM Musca	4128	9356311	9 June 2009	In service	
