= Nuri-class container ship =

Series of container ships

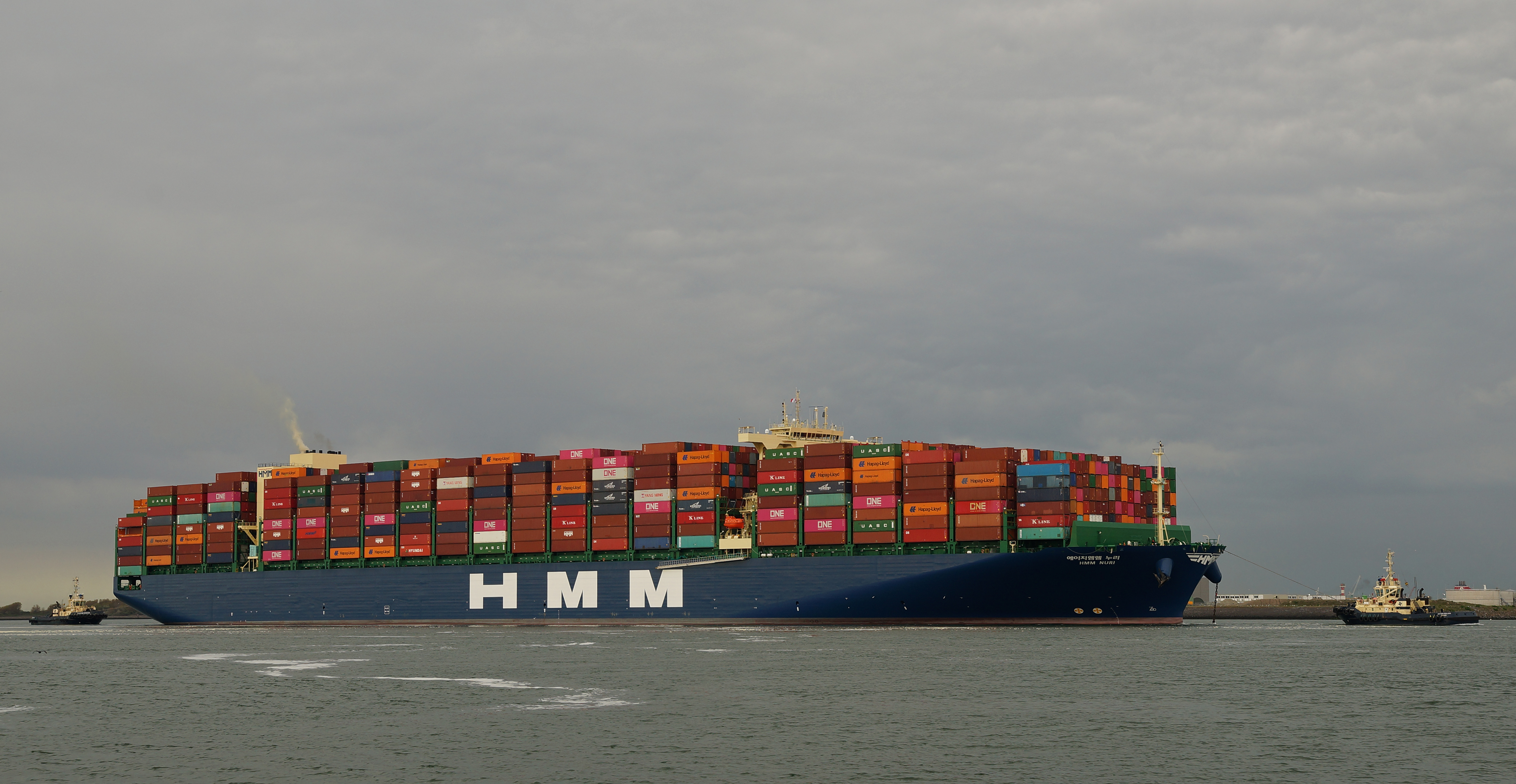
- HMM Nuri entering the port of Rotterdam

Class overview
- Builders: Hyundai Heavy Industries
- Operators: HMM Co Ltd.
- In service: 2021–present
- Planned: 8
- Completed: 8
- Active: 8

General characteristics
- Type: Container ship
- Tonnage: 152,003 GT
- Length: 366 m (1,201 ft)
- Beam: 51 m (167 ft)
- Draft: 16 m (52 ft)
- Capacity: 16,010 TEU

The Nuri class is a series of eight container ships built for HMM. The ships were built by Hyundai Heavy Industries in South Korea. The ships were ordered in 2018 together with the 12 ships from the Algeciras class and have a maximum theoretical capacity of 16,010 TEU. The first ship of this series entered into service in March 2021.

== List of ships ==
Ship	Yard number	IMO number	Delivery	Status	Flag	ref
HMM Nuri	3097	9869162	19 March 2021	In service	South Korea	
HMM Gaon	3098	9869174	26 March 2021	In service	South Korea	
HMM Garam	3099	9869186	30 April 2021	In service	South Korea	
HMM Mir	3100	9869198	7 May 2021	In service	South Korea	
HMM Hanbada	3101	9869203	14 May 2021	In service	South Korea	
HMM Raon	3102	9869215	28 May 2021	In service	South Korea	
HMM Daon	3103	9869227	18 June 2021	In service	South Korea	
HMM Hanul	3104	9869239	25 June 2021	In service	South Korea	

== See also ==
- HMM Algeciras-class container ship
- Hyundai Dream-class container ship
- Hyundai Together-class container ship
- Hyundai Earth-class container ship
