= CMA CGM Vela =

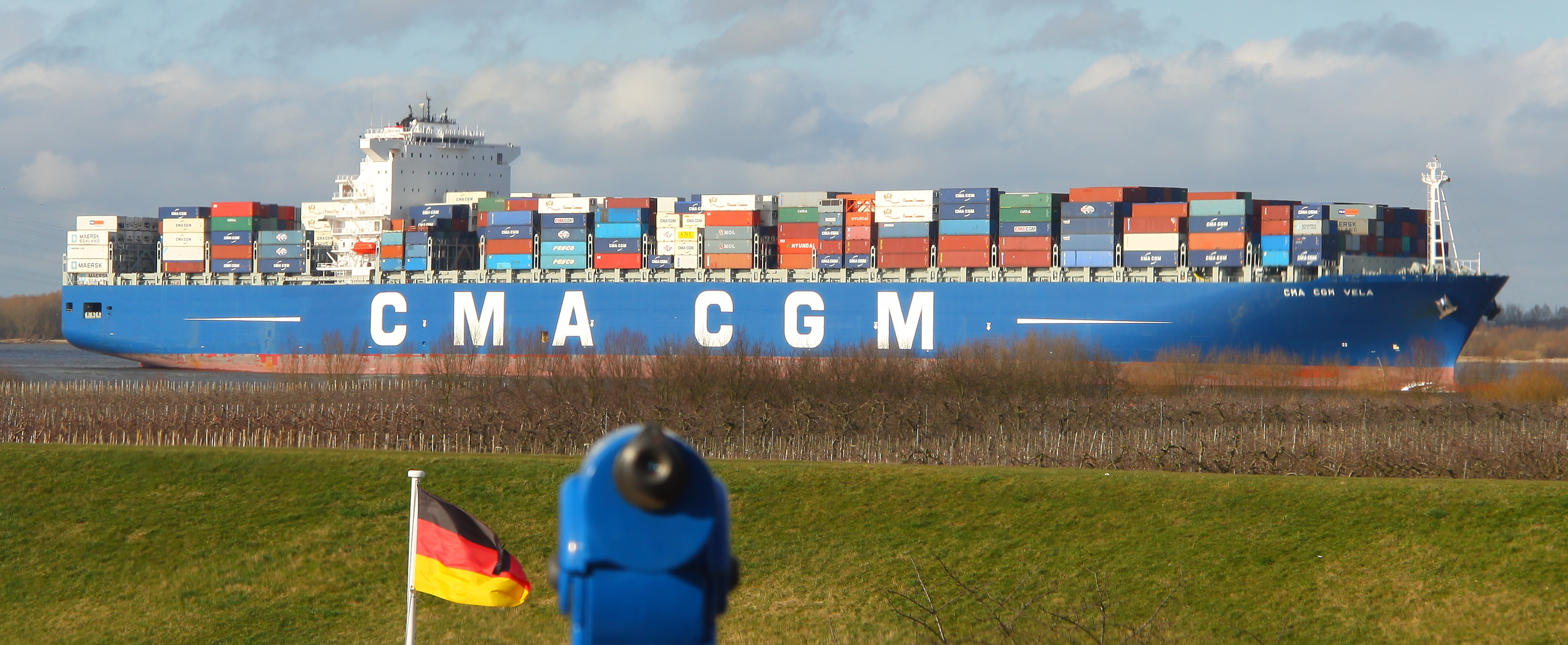
- CMA CGM Vela on the Elbe heading towards Hamburg.

History

Portugal
- Name: CMA CGM Vela
- Operator: CMA CGM
- Builder: Daewoo Shipbuilding
- Yard number: 4125
- Launched: 2008
- Identification: IMO number: 9354923; MMSI number: 255805983; Callsign: CQIK3
- Status: Currently in service

General characteristics
- Class & type: CMA CGM Vela-class container ship
- Tonnage: 131,831 dwt; 128,600 gt; 72,696 nt
- Length: 347.48 m (1,140.0 ft)
- Beam: 45.20 m (148.3 ft)
- Draft: 15.50 m (50.9 ft)
- Propulsion: MAN B&W 12K98ME-C engine
- Speed: 24.8 knots (46 km/h) (maximum); 24.3 knots (45 km/h) (cruising)
- Capacity: 11,040 TEU containers

CMA CGM Vela is a container ship operated by CMA CGM. The ship is owned by Reederei NSB and operated by CMA CGM. The CMA CGM Vela was finished in 2008 by Daewoo Shipbuilding & Marine Engineering Ltd and delivered to the owner on 19 October 2008. The ship was carrying yard number DSME hull 4125 and after launching it was christened in the ships home port Hamburg, Germany.

== Design ==
CMA CGM Vela is one of the largest ships in the fleet of CMA CGM. The vessel is 347.48 m (1,140.0 ft) long, has a beam of 45.20 m (148.3 ft) and maximum draft of 15.50 m (50.9 ft). The ship has a deadweight of 131,831 tonnes and capacity for 11,040 teu. The gross tonnage of the vessel is 128,600 and the net tonnage is 72,696. The CMA CGM Vela has a Suez gross tonnage of 130392,48 GT and a Suez net tonnage of 114078,26 NT.

== Engine ==
The CMA CGM Vela was built according to the latest IMO requirements. The ships main engine, a MAN B&W 12K98ME-C, produces enough power to reach a cruising speed of 24.3 knots.
