= CMA CGM Thalassa =

History

Cyprus
- Name: CMA CGM Thalassa
- Operator: CMA CGM
- Builder: Daewoo Shipbuilding
- Yard number: 4126
- Laid down: 22 July 2008
- Launched: 4 October 2008
- Completed: 30 December 2008
- Status: Currently in service
- Notes: IMO number: 9356294; MMSI number: 212151000; Callsign: 5BNE2

General characteristics
- Class & type: CMA CGM Vela-class container ship
- Tonnage: 130,700 dwt
- Length: 346.50 m (1,136.8 ft)
- Beam: 43.20 m (141.7 ft)
- Draft: 15.50 m (50.9 ft)
- Propulsion: MAN B&W 12K98MC-C engines; 72,264 kW
- Speed: 24.7 knots (46 km/h) (maximum); 24.3 knots (45 km/h) (cruising)
- Capacity: 11,040 TEU containers

CMA CGM Thalassa is a container ship owned by Global Ship Lease and on long-term charter to the shipping line CMA CGM. The ship was delivered to the ship operator on 30 December 2008. The vessel was built by Daewoo Shipbuilding & Marine Engineering in South Korea.

== Design ==
The overall length of the container ship is 346.50 m (1,136.8 ft) and the beam is 43.20 m (141.7 ft). CMA CGM Thalassa has draft of 15.50 m (50.9 ft) and a deadweight of 130,700 tonnes. The ship has a capacity of 10,960 TEU.

== Engine ==
The main engine of CMA CGM Thalassa is a MAN Diesel 12K98ME-C, which produces 72,264 kW enabling the vessel to reach a maximum speed of 24.7 knots. The cruising speed of the container ship is 24.3 knots.
