= HMM (company) =

South Korean shipping line

HMM Company Limited

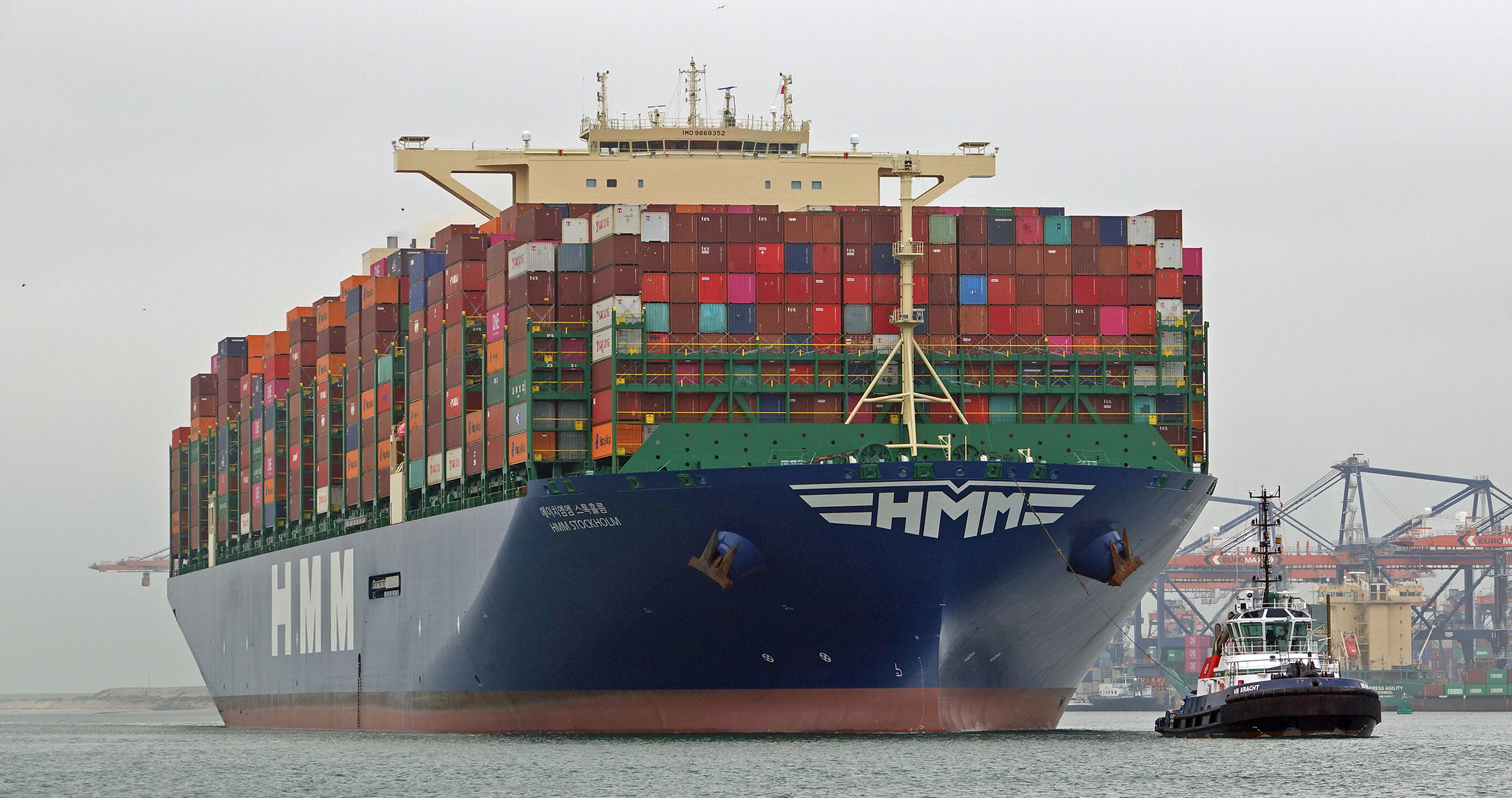
- HMM Stockholm
- Native name: 에이치엠엠
- Formerly: Asia Merchant Marine; Hyundai Merchant Marine
- Type: Public
- Traded as: KRX: 011200
- Industry: Container shipping
- Founded: March 25, 1976; 50 years ago
- Headquarters: Busan, South Korea
- Area served: Worldwide
- Key people: Kyung-bae Kim (CEO) Sales11.5trillion won 18.4T(2022) Net profit3.17T won(10.1T 2022)
- Website: www.hmm21.com

HMM Company Limited (Korean: 에이치엠엠), formerly known as Hyundai Merchant Marine (현대상선), is a South Korean container transportation and shipping company.

== Overview ==
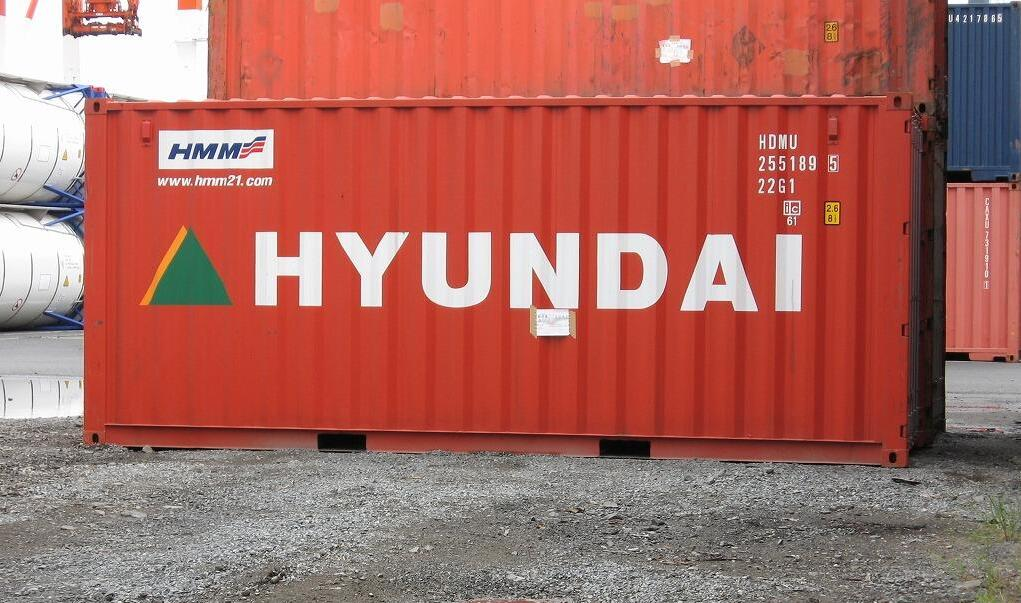
Hyundai container in Japan.

HMM moves the largest portion of South Korea's exports, becoming the number one Korean national container carrier, especially since Hanjin Shipping was declared bankrupt and ordered to be liquidated.

The company's office network is composed of four international headquarters, 27 subsidiaries, 76 branches, five overseas offices and 10 liaison offices.

On the domestic market, HMM transports strategic materials such as crude oil, iron ore/coal and diverse special products as well as import/export goods. As of 2024, the revenue is approximately 12 trillion Korean won.

As of 2020, HMM has built and launched the world's two largest container ships in terms of TEU capacity, the HMM Algeciras with a maximum TEU capacity of 23,964, and the HMM Copenhagen with a maximum capacity of 23,820 TEU.

In December 2023, HMM sale fell through when negotiations with the preferred bidder, Harim Group, finally broke down.

== THE Alliance - Premier Alliance ==
Along with Hapag-Lloyd, Ocean Network Express, and Yang Ming Marine Transport Corporation, HMM was a member of THE Alliance. THE Alliance was intended to provide 34 services, directly calling at 81 different ports on a monthly basis. From March 2025, THE Alliance was replaced by Premier Alliance, composed by the same members, excluding Hapag-Lloyd.

== History ==
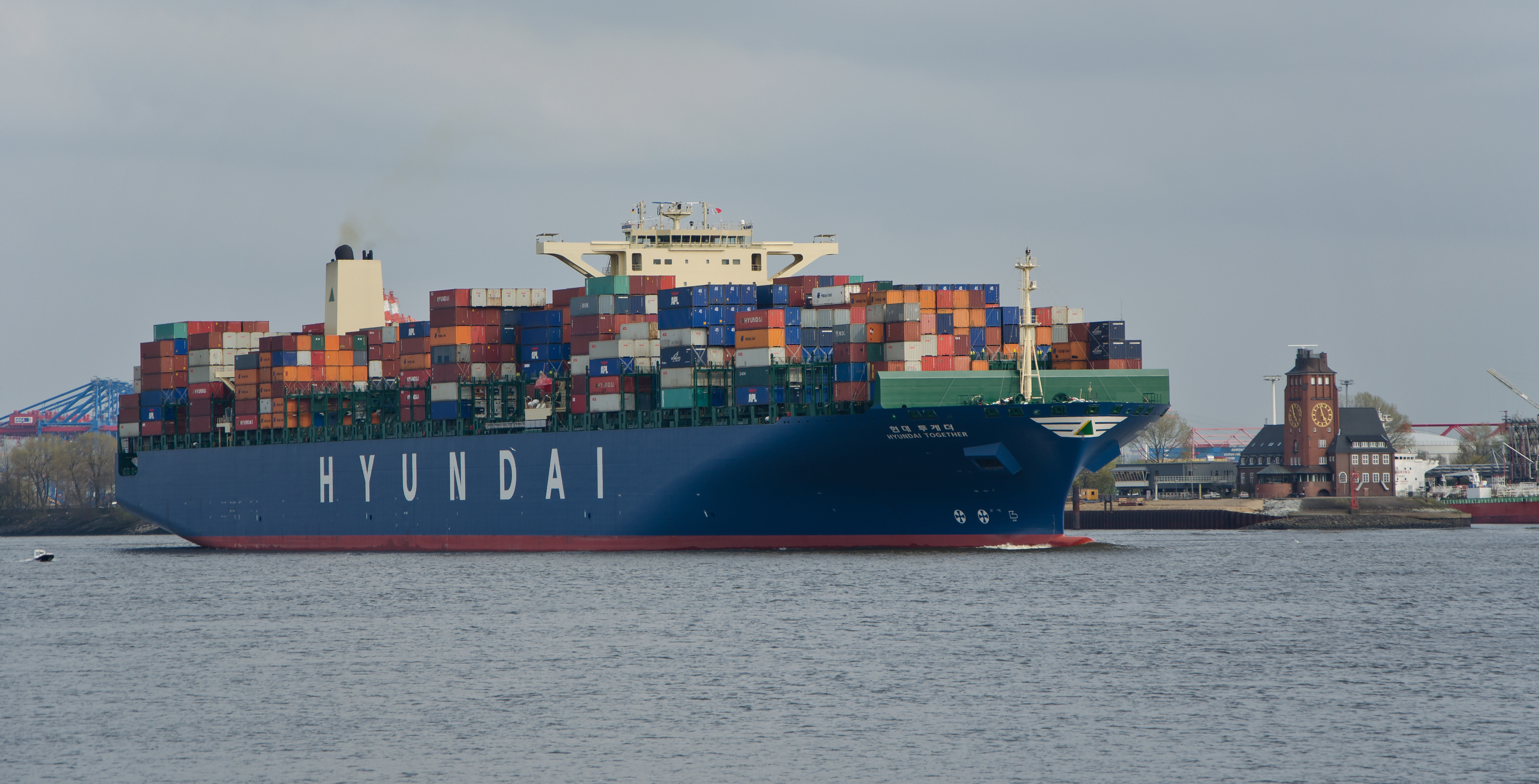
Hyundai Together at Hamburg

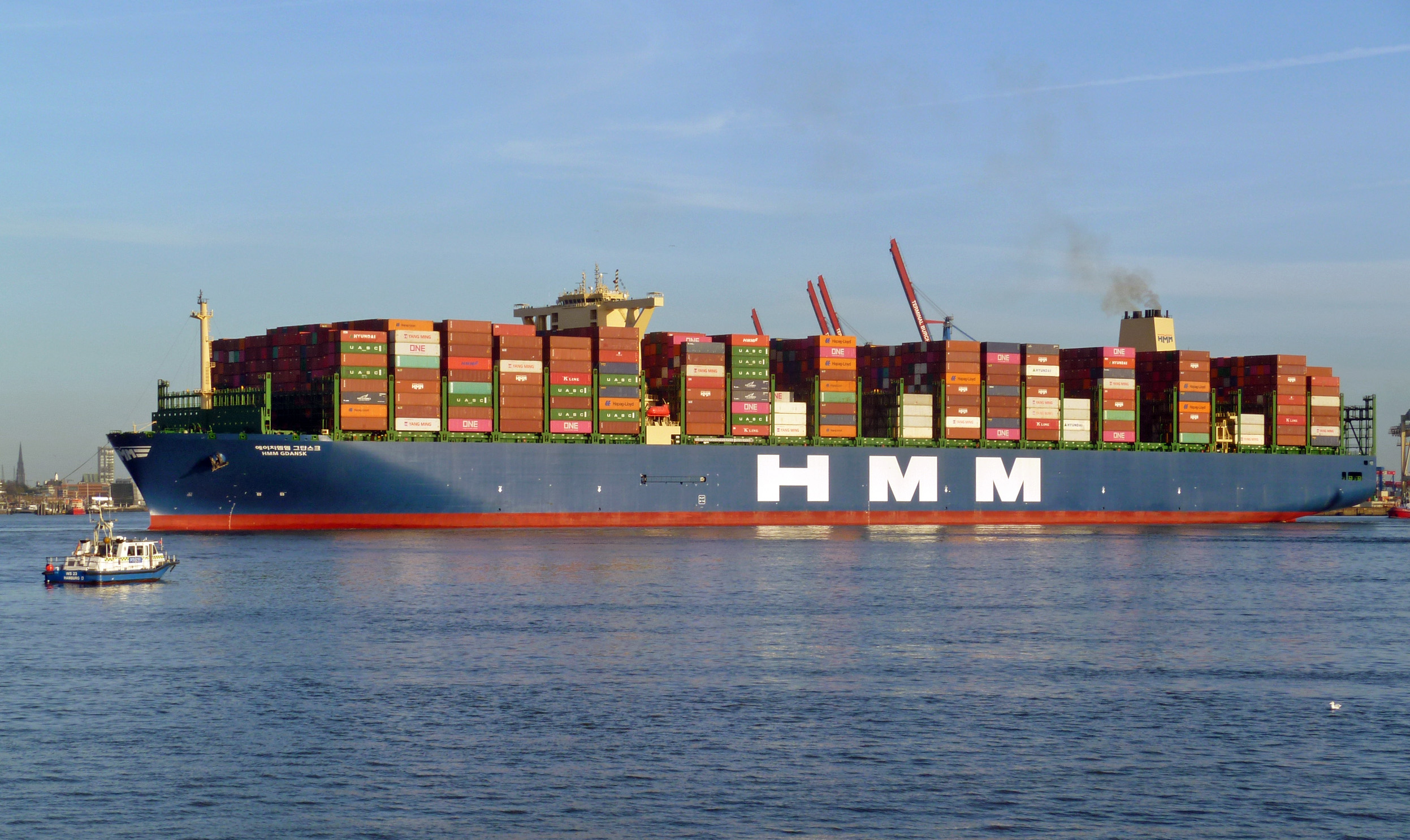
HMM Gdansk of the HMM Algeciras-class container ships

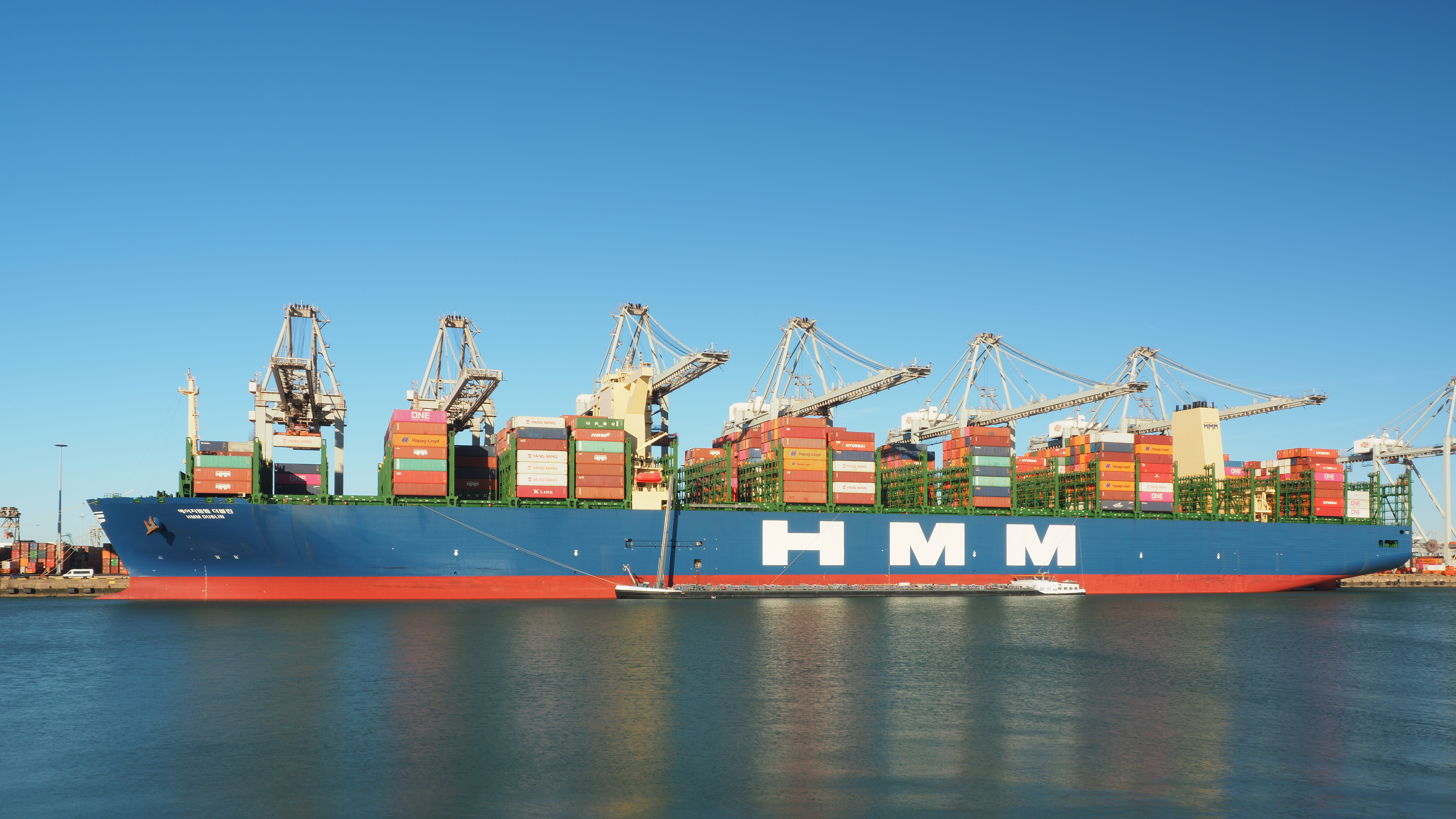
HMM Dublin

=== Hyundai Merchant Marine ===
1970s

- Company established as Asia Merchant Marine on March 25, with a capital of 200 million.
- Conventional liner service opened between the Far East and the Middle East.
- Tramper liner service established between Asia and the Middle East.
- Container service introduced between the Far East and the Middle East.

1980s

- PCC (Pure Car Carrier) service inaugurated on the Far East/Europe, Korea/Australia and Korea/India routes.
- Purchased Hyundai No.1, first car carrier in Korea.
- Integrated Halla Marine Transportation, Shinhan Marine Transportation, and Donghae Merchant Marine as shipping agents, and Sunil Merchant Marine as subsidiary shipper.
- Launched on Korea/Australia, Canada route.
- Full container service opened between the Far East and the Western Us.
- Constructed and purchased the world's largest ore & coal carrier Hyundai Giant.
- Merged with Donghae Merchant Marine and Shinhan Merchant Marine.

1990s

- Seven of the world's largest and fastest container ships (5,551 TEU) purchased.
- Designated as the first LNG operation shipping company in Korea.
- Founded joint company Korea-Soviet Shipping with Chunkyung Shipping.
- Joint operation with SEA-LAND initiated on Asia Europe Express route.
- Acquired exclusive use of container terminals in Busan and Kwangyang.
- HMM became the first shipping company worldwide to acquire ISM Code and ISO 9002 certification at the same time.
- President Park Se-yong awarded the trophy for excellence in business on Marine Transport Day.
- Leased private terminal in Kaohsiung, Taiwan.
- Founded inland depot in Hong Kong.
- Introduced the first international video-conferencing system in shipping industry (Seoul-LA).
- Signed lease agreement with the Port of Tacoma President Park Se-yong awarded a Gold Tower Medal for his contribution to the shipping industry in Korea.
- The New World Alliance" service begins together with APL and MOL.
- Started Woodchip Carrier Service.
- Established "Hyundai Fleet Management System" which covers information such as weather conditions, vessel locations and current changes.
- Employed 4 female crew members.
- Acquired two cruise ships, Hyundai Kumgang and Hyundai Pongnae.
- Opened Hyundai Busan container terminal, the largest public container terminal in Korea.

2000s

- Proclaimed the new management vision for the 21st century, 'HMM21'.
- President and CEO, Choong-Shik Kim was awarded Gold Tower industrial medal in the 5th Ocean Day.
- Built a 'Cyber Customer Service Center' in the HMM internet homepage.
- Sold the Car Carrier division that became EUKOR.
- Appointed Noh Jeong-ik as the new president and CEO.
- Set up a sisterhood relationship with Beophwan-dong, Jejudo
- Named Kim Seong-man as the new President (1.4)
- Launched new 8,600 TEU containership Hyundai Brave (1.10)
- Appointed Kim Seong-man as president and CEO
- Began a slot exchange with Hanjin Shipping on the Asia-East Coast of U.S. route

2010s

- Established a joint venture 'Netruck Franz' with Hyundai Logiem and SK Energy
- Named Kim Seong-Man as Vice Chairman and Lee Suk-Hui as president and CEO
- Joined world's largest shipping alliance, G6
- Established a ship management company ‘Hyundai Ocean Service Co., Ltd.
- Ordered and launched Hyundai Pride
- Participated in “Pusan New Port Container Terminal Phase 2-4 Project”
- Subsidiary G-Marine Service Co., Ltd., operator of the Roll-on/Roll-off car carrier Golden Ray was instructed to revise its safety management system to verify and audit stability calculations before leaving port, and crew adherence to the watertight door closure entry on departure, after the Golden Ray capsized in the Port of Brunswick, Georgia (U.S. state) in calm weather because incorrect calculations led to an unstable ship leaving port on September 8, 2019.

=== HMM Co., Ltd. ===
On 9 March 2020, Hyundai Merchant Marine board decide to rebrand the company as HMM Co., Ltd.

On 29 April 2020, HMM held the naming ceremony for the newly constructed 23,964 TEU-class container ship HMM Algeciras, the largest container ships in the world at the time of her launch.

== Fleet ==
Container ship classes of HMM
Ship class	Built	Capacity (TEU)	Ships in class	Notes
Hyundai Together-class	2012	13,082	5	Long-term charter from Danao Ship Leasing Corporation
Hyundai Dream-class	2014	13,154	5	
Hyundai Earth-class	2016	10,077	6	Long-term charter from Zodiac Maritime
HMM Algeciras-class	2020	23,964–23,820	12	HMM Algeciras was the world’s largest container ship when it was delivered in April 2020.
HMM Nuri-class	2021	16,010	8	
HMM Garnet-class	2023	13,000	12	
TBD	2024	1,800	3	
TBD	2025	9,000	7+2	To be built by HD Hyundai Samho and HJ Shipbuilding.
TBD	2028–2029	13,000	12	To be built by HD Hyundai Samho and Hanhwa Ocean.
TBD	2029	13,000	4	To be built by Hanwha Ocean.
TBD	2029	13,400	8	To be built by HD Hyundai Samho.

== See also ==
- List of largest container shipping companies
- Hanjin Shipping
- Ocean Network Express
- Hyundai Glovis
- EUKOR
