= Hanwha Ocean =

South Korean shipbuilding company

Hanwha Ocean Co., Ltd.
- Native name: 한화오션 주식회사
- Formerly: Daewoo Shipbuilding Industries (1978–2002); Daewoo Shipbuilding & Marine Engineering (2002–2023)
- Type: Public
- Traded as: KRX: 042660
- Industry: Defense; Shipbuilding
- Founded: 26 September 1978; 47 years ago
- Headquarters: 3370, Geoje-daero, Geoje-si, Gyeongsangnam-do, South Korea
- Number of locations: 3: Okpo, Houston, London
- Area served: Worldwide
- Key people: Kwon Hyuk-woong (CEO)
- Products: Drillships; FPSO; LNG-Regasification vessels; LNG/LPG; Naval ships; offshore structures; Passenger ships; Semi-submersible; VLGC/VLCC
- Revenue: ▲ ₩10.776 trillion (2024)
- Operating income: ▲ ₩237.9 billion (2024)
- Net income: ▲ ₩528.2 billion (2024)
- Total assets: ▲ ₩17.8438 trillion (2024)
- Total equity: ▲ ₩4.8634 trillion (2024)
- Owner: Hanwha Aerospace (65.77%); National Pension Service (5.81%); Employee stock ownership (4.85%); Treasury stocks (0.01%)
- Number of employees: 8,645 (March 31, 2022)
- Parent: Hanwha Group
- Website: Official website in English; Official website in Korean

Hanwha Ocean Co., Ltd. (Korean: 한화오션), formerly known as Daewoo Shipbuilding & Marine Engineering (Korean: 대우조선해양), is one of the "Big Three" shipbuilders of South Korea, along with Hyundai and Samsung.

== History ==
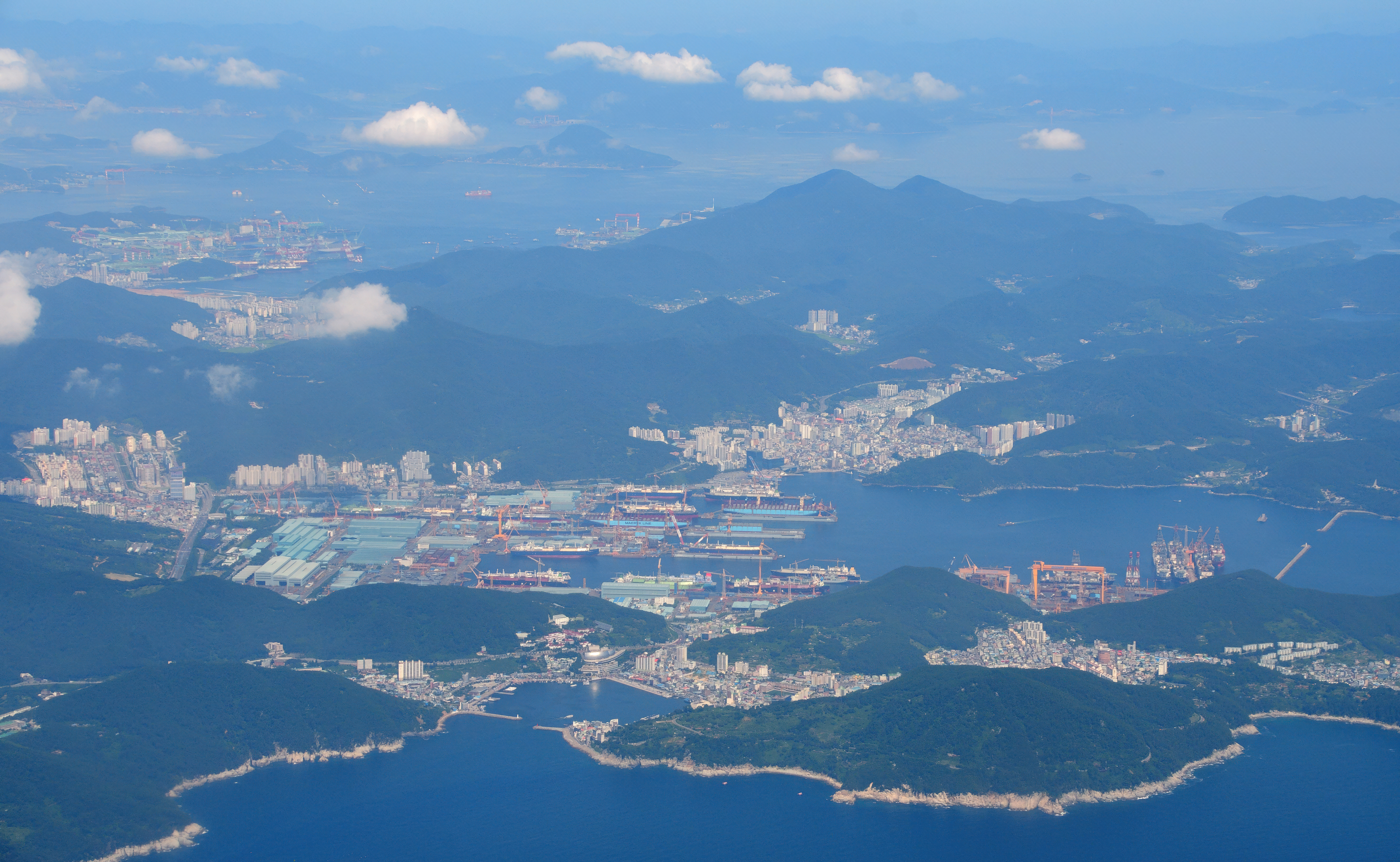
Aerial view of Daewoo Shipbuilding & Marine Engineering in August 2017

- Hanwha Ocean
- Hangul: 한화오션
- RR: Hanhwa osyeon
- MR: Hanhwa osyŏn

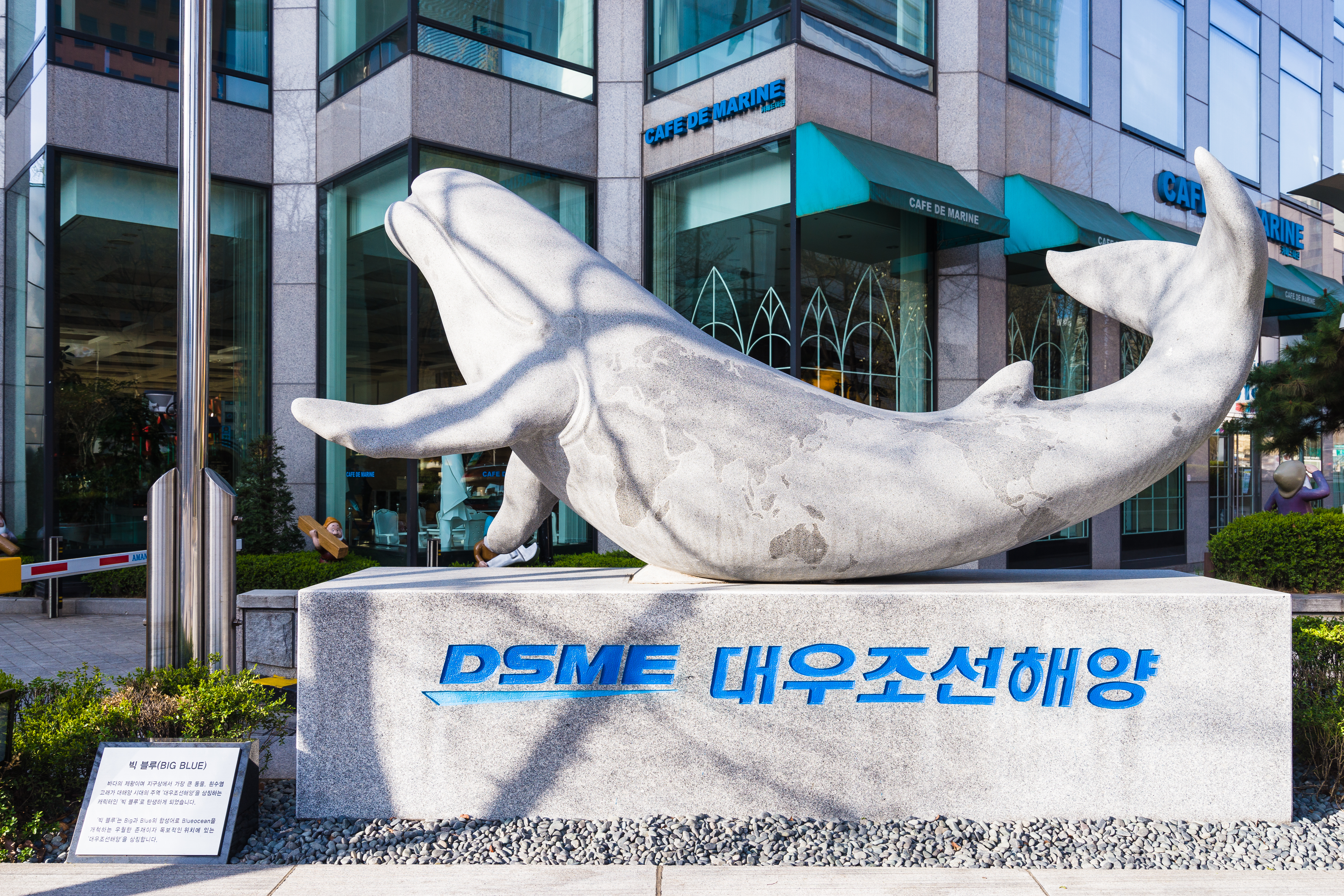
"Big Blue" statue at the former DSME headquarters, 2015

In 1978, Daewoo acquired what would become DSME.

On 21 February 2011, the A. P. Moller-Maersk Group (Maersk) ordered 10 large container ships from DSME, each with a capacity of 18,000 containers, surpassing the then record holder; the Mærsk E-class at 15,200 containers. The contract is worth $1.9bn. The first was to be delivered in 2014. In June 2011, Maersk ordered ten more, for another $1.9bn. The new class is called the Triple E class.

On December 20, 2011, Daewoo Shipbuilding Marine Engineering won the largest single defense contract by a Korean firm; valued at $1.07 billion to build three Indonesian submarines. It also would mark the first exports of submarines from South Korea.

On 22 February 2012, a £452 million order was placed with DSME for four 37,000 tonne double hulled 'MARS' fast fleet tankers by Britain's Ministry of Defence for the Royal Fleet Auxiliary. The ships entered service in 2017.

The firm built 15 icebreaking LNG carriers commissioned by Yamal LNG which are used to export liquefied natural gas from the Russian Arctic. The ice class Arc7 Yamalmax ships are designed to operate year-round from the Yamal Peninsula and to break ice up to 1.5 m (4.9 ft) thick when sailing bow first and up to 2.1 m (6.9 ft) thick in astern direction. The tankers were designed in Finland by Aker Arctic Technology Inc.

The South Korean Board of Audit and Inspection found ₩1.5 trillion (equivalent to ₩1.83 trillion or US$1.28 billion in 2025) of accounting fraud in DSME's books on 15 June 2016. In July, 2016, shares in DSME were suspended from trading, and were announced to be suspended until at least September 28, 2017. After suffering losses of Won3.3tn in 2015 and Won2.7tn in 2016, it was given a ₩2.9 trillion (equivalent to ₩3.46 trillion or US$2.44 billion in 2025) government loan in March 2017 to prevent bankruptcy.

In 2017, it was uncovered that North Korea may have hacked the company and stole company's blueprints in April 2016.

In December 2022, Hanwha Group announced that it would acquire a controlling 49.3 percent stake in Daewoo Shipbuilding & Marine Engineering worth 2 trillion won (US$1.5 billion). The deal was supported by the Korea Development Bank in an attempt to improve competition in the Korean shipbuilding industry.

In July 2024, Hanwha Ocean became the second Korean shipbuilder after Hyundai Heavy Industries to sign a master ship repair agreement (MSRA) with Naval Supply Systems Command (NAVSUP), qualifying it to participate in the U.S. Navy's MRO business.

On 29 August 2024, Hanwha Ocean won an MRO contract for the USNS Wally Schirra, the US Navy's auxiliary ship, and 3 months of maintenance work will take place at the Geoje Shipyard from 2 September 2024.

In July 2026, Canadian Prime Minister Mark Carney selected Germany's TKMS over Hanwha Ocean for the country's multi-billion dollar submarine fleet construction contract.

== Ships built ==
- Crane vessels
  - 1 Pioneering Spirit
- Container ships
  - 20 Triple E class
  - 11 Triple E class (Gen2)
  - 10 of 16 Gülsün class
  - 8 of 14 Explorer class
  - 6 Earth class
  - 5 Dream class
  - 6 of 14 Pegasus class
  - 23 Danit class
  - 6 Olympic class
  - 5 CMA CGM Vela class
- Submarines
  - 3 Type 214
  - 8 of 9 Jang Bogo class
  - 2 Nagapasa class
  - 2 of 9 Dosan Ahn Changho class
- Surface naval
  - 3 of 6 Chungmugong Yi Sun-sin-class destroyers
  - 3 Gwanggaeto the Great-class destroyers
  - 4 of 8 Daegu-class frigates
  - 3 of 9 Ulsan-class frigates
  - 1 of 4 Donghae-class corvettes
- Auxiliary ships
  - 1 of 2 Soyang-class fast combat support ships
  - 5 of 5 Tide-class tankers

== Corporate governance ==
=== Ownership ===
Major shareholders as of 2025
Shareholder	Country	Stake (%)
Hanwha Aerospace	South Korea	65.77%
National Pension Service	South Korea	5.81%
Hanwha Ocean Employee stock ownership	South Korea	4.85%
Treasury Stocks	South Korea	0.1%

== See also ==
- List of shipbuilders and shipyards
- Defense industry of South Korea
- Daewoo dissolution and corruption scandal
