= T-class containership =

Container ship class

Class overview
- Builders: Yangzijiang Shipbuilding
- Operators: Maersk Line
- In service: 2026–
- Planned: 6+2
- Building: 6
- Completed: 4
- Active: 4

General characteristics
- Type: Container ship
- Tonnage: TBC
- Propulsion: Methanol (dual fuel)
- Capacity: 9000 TEU

The Maersk T class is a series of 6 container ships built for Maersk Line by Yangzijiang Shipbuilding. The ships are the third dual fuel container ship class in the Maersk fleet after A-class container ship and B-class container ship.

== List of ships ==
Ship	Yard number	IMO number	Delivery	Status	Ref
Tangier Mærsk		1029338	2 February 2026	In service	
Tema Mærsk		1029340	May 2026	In service	
Tauranga Mærsk		1029352	June 2026	In service	
Tacoma Mærsk		1029364	26 August 2026	In service	
Tianjin Mærsk		1029376		Under Construction	
TBA					
+2 on option
TBD					
TBD					

== See also ==
- Maersk A-class container ship
- Maersk B-class container ship
- Maersk Triple E-class container ship
- Maersk E-class container ship
- Maersk H-class container ship
- Maersk Edinburgh-class container ship
- Gudrun Maersk-class container ship
- Maersk M-class container ship
- Maersk C-class container ship
