= Maersk V-class container ship =

Container ship class

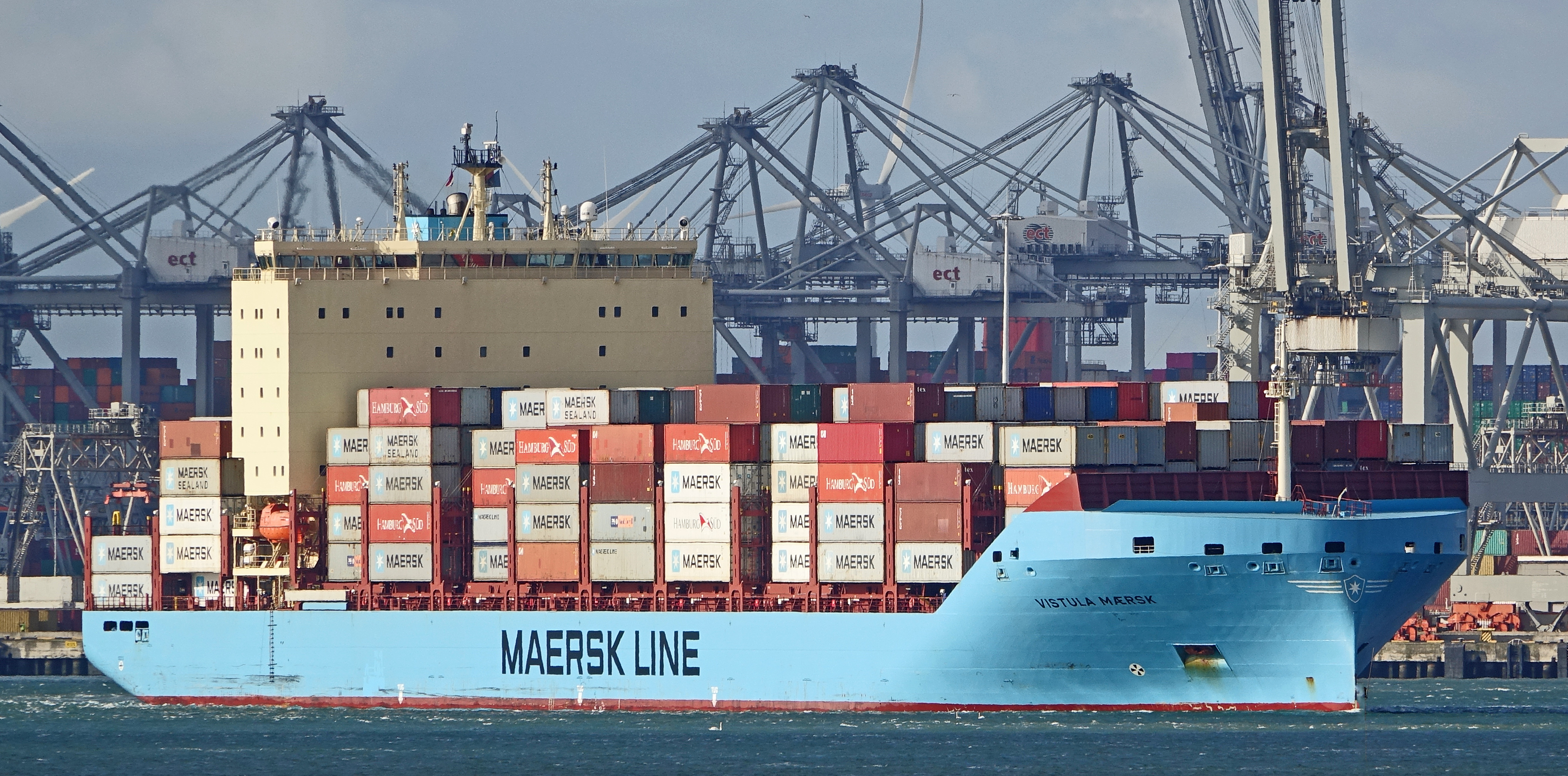
- Vistula Maersk in the Port of Rotterdam.

Class overview
- Builders: COSCO Zhoushan Shipyard
- Operators: Maersk Line
- In service: 2018–present
- Planned: 7
- Completed: 7
- Active: 7

General characteristics
- Type: Container ship
- Tonnage: 34,882 GT
- Length: 200 m (660 ft)
- Beam: 35.3 m (116 ft)
- Draft: 11.5 m (38 ft)
- Ice class: 1A
- Capacity: 3,600 TEU

The V class is a series of 7 container ships built for Maersk Line. They were the largest container ships with ice class 1A when they were built. The ships were built by COSCO Zhoushan Shipyard in China and have a maximum theoretical capacity of around 3,600 twenty-foot equivalent units (TEU).

== List of ships ==
Ship	Yard number	IMO number	Delivery	Status	ref
Vistula Maersk	N688	9775737	1 Feb 2018	In service	
Volga Maersk	N689	9775749	3 Apr 2018	In service	
Vayenga Maersk	N690	9775751	29 May 2018	In service	
Venta Maersk	N691	9775763	11 Jul 2018	In service	
Vuoksi Maersk	N692	9775775	11 Sep 2018	In service	
Vilnia Maersk	N693	9778533	7 Jan 2019	In service	
Vaga Maersk	N694	9778545	20 Mar 2019	In service	

== See also ==
- Maersk Triple E-class container ship
- Maersk E-class container ship
- Maersk H-class container ship
- Maersk Edinburgh-class container ship
- Gudrun Maersk-class container ship
- Maersk M-class container ship
- Maersk C-class container ship
