= Sovereign Maersk-class container ship =

Container ship class

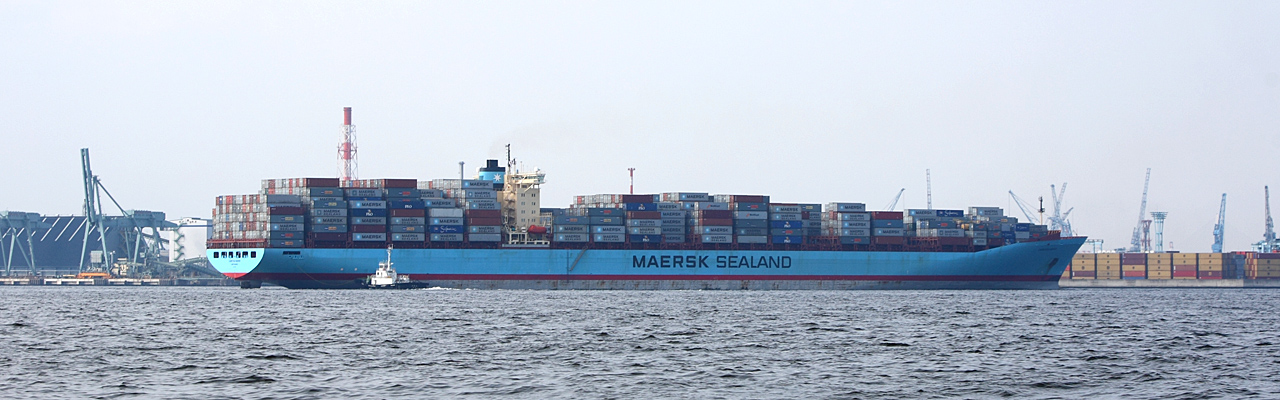
- Sovereign Maersk in the Port of Yokohama

Class overview
- Builders: Odense Steel Shipyard
- Operators: Maersk Line, Mediterranean Shipping Company
- Succeeded by: Maersk C-class container ship
- In service: 1997–present
- Planned: 9
- Completed: 9
- Active: 8
- Scrapped: 1

General characteristics
- Type: Container ship
- Tonnage: 91,560 GT
- Length: 346.98 m (1,138.4 ft)
- Beam: 42.80 m (140.4 ft)
- Draft: 14.5 m (48 ft)
- Capacity: 9,640 TEU

Sovereign class is a series of 9 container ships built for Maersk Line. The ships were built by Odense Steel Shipyard in Denmark and have a maximum theoretical capacity of around 9,640 twenty-foot equivalent units (TEU).

== List of ships ==
=== Maersk owned ===
| Ship | Previous names | Yard number | IMO number | Delivery | Status | ref |
|---|---|---|---|---|---|---|
| Sally Maersk | | L162 | 9120865 | 6 Mar 1998 | In service | |
| Skagen Maersk | | L168 | 9166792 | 10 Sep 1999 | In service | |
| Clifford Maersk | | L169 | 9198575 | 8 Oct 1999 | In service | |

=== New owner ===
| Ship | Previous names | Yard number | IMO number | Delivery | Status | ref |
|---|---|---|---|---|---|---|
| MSC Domna X | Sovereign Maersk (1997-2023) | L160 | 9120841 | 1 Sep 1997 | In service | |
| MSC Fie X | Susan Maersk (1997-2021) | L161 | 9120853 | 12 Dec 1997 | In service | |
| MSC Yukta X | Svendborg Maersk (1998-2023) | L164 | 9146467 | 25 Sep 1998 | In service | |
| MSC Vilda X | Sofie Maersk (1998-2021) | L165 | 9146479 | 15 Dec 1998 | In service | |
| MSC Aby | Svend Maersk (1999-2016); Aotea Maersk (2016-2021) | L166 | 9166778 | 15 Mar 1999 | In service | |
| MSC Ellen | Soroe Maersk (1999-2021) | L167 | 9166780 | 4 Jun 1999 | In service | |
| MSC Chiara X | Cornelius Maersk (2000-2021) | L170 | 9198587 | 4 Feb 2000 | In service | |

=== Scrapped ===
| Ship | Previous names | Yard number | IMO number | Delivery | Status | ref |
|---|---|---|---|---|---|---|
| Sine Maersk | | L163 | 9146455 | 29 Jun 1998 | Scrapped in 2020 | |

== See also ==
- Maersk Triple E-class container ship
- Maersk E-class container ship
- Maersk H-class container ship
- Maersk Edinburgh-class container ship
- Gudrun Maersk-class container ship
- Maersk M-class container ship
- Maersk C-class container ship
- Maersk A-class container ship
