= B-class container ship =

Container ship class

Class overview
- Builders: Hyundai Heavy Industries
- Operators: Maersk Line
- In service: 2025–
- Planned: 6
- Building: 6
- Completed: 6
- Active: 5

General characteristics
- Type: Container ship
- Tonnage: TBC
- Length: 350.59 m (1,150 ft 3 in)
- Beam: 56.00 m (183 ft 9 in) tbc
- Propulsion: Methanol (dual fuel)
- Capacity: 17,480 TEU

The Maersk B class is a series of 6 container ships built for Maersk Line by Hyundai Heavy Industries. They are the largest container ships run on methanol. The ships are the second dual fuel container ship class after A-class container ship.

== List of ships ==
Ship	Yard number	IMO number	Delivery	Status	Ref
Berlin Mærsk		9984560	18 June 2025	In service	
Beijing Mærsk		9984572	6 August 2025	In service	
Bangkok Mærsk		9984584	4 September 2025	In service	
Brisbane Mærsk		9984596	October 2025	In service	
Brussels Mærsk		9984601	5 November 2025	In service	
Barcelona Mærsk		9984613	January 2026	In service	

== See also ==
- Maersk A-class container ship
- Maersk Triple E-class container ship
- Maersk E-class container ship
- Maersk H-class container ship
- Maersk Edinburgh-class container ship
- Gudrun Maersk-class container ship
- Maersk M-class container ship
- Maersk C-class container ship
