= Maersk A-class container ship =

Container ship class

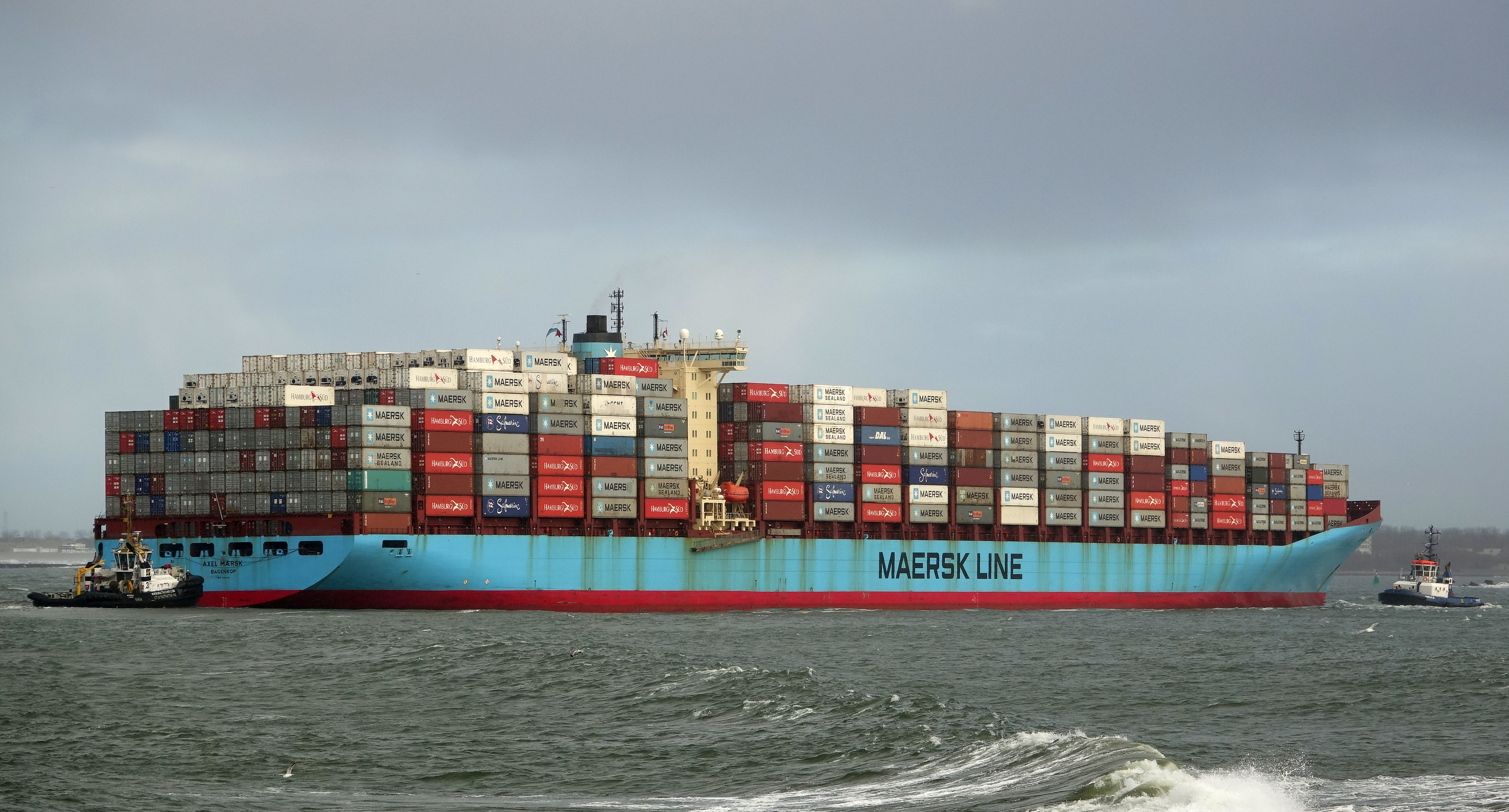
- Axel Maersk entering the Port of Rotterdam

Class overview
- Builders: Odense Steel Shipyard
- Operators: Maersk Line
- In service: 2003–present
- Planned: 6
- Completed: 6
- Active: 6

General characteristics
- Type: Container ship
- Tonnage: 93,496 GT
- Length: 352.25 m (1,155.7 ft)
- Beam: 42.9 m (141 ft)
- Draft: 15 m (49 ft)
- Capacity: 8,272 TEU

The A class is a series of 6 container ships built for Maersk Line. The ships were built by Odense Steel Shipyard in Denmark and have a maximum theoretical capacity of around 8,272 twenty-foot equivalent units (TEU).

== List of ships ==
Ship	Yard number	IMO number	Delivery	Status	ref	new name
Axel Maersk	L185	9260419	3 Mar 2003	In service		GSL Lydia
Anna Maersk	L186	9260421	27 May 2003	In service		GSL Sofia
Arnold Maersk	L187	9260433	5 Sep 2003	In service		GSL Effie
Arthur Maersk	L188	9260445	18 Nov 2003	In service		Maria Y
Adrian Maersk	L189	9260457	2 Apr 2004	In service		GSL Alexandra
Albert Maersk	L190	9260469	27 Aug 2004	In service		Kostas K

== See also ==
- Maersk Triple E-class container ship
- Maersk E-class container ship
- Maersk H-class container ship
- Maersk Edinburgh-class container ship
- Gudrun Maersk-class container ship
- Maersk M-class container ship
- Maersk C-class container ship
