= A-class container ship =

Container ship class

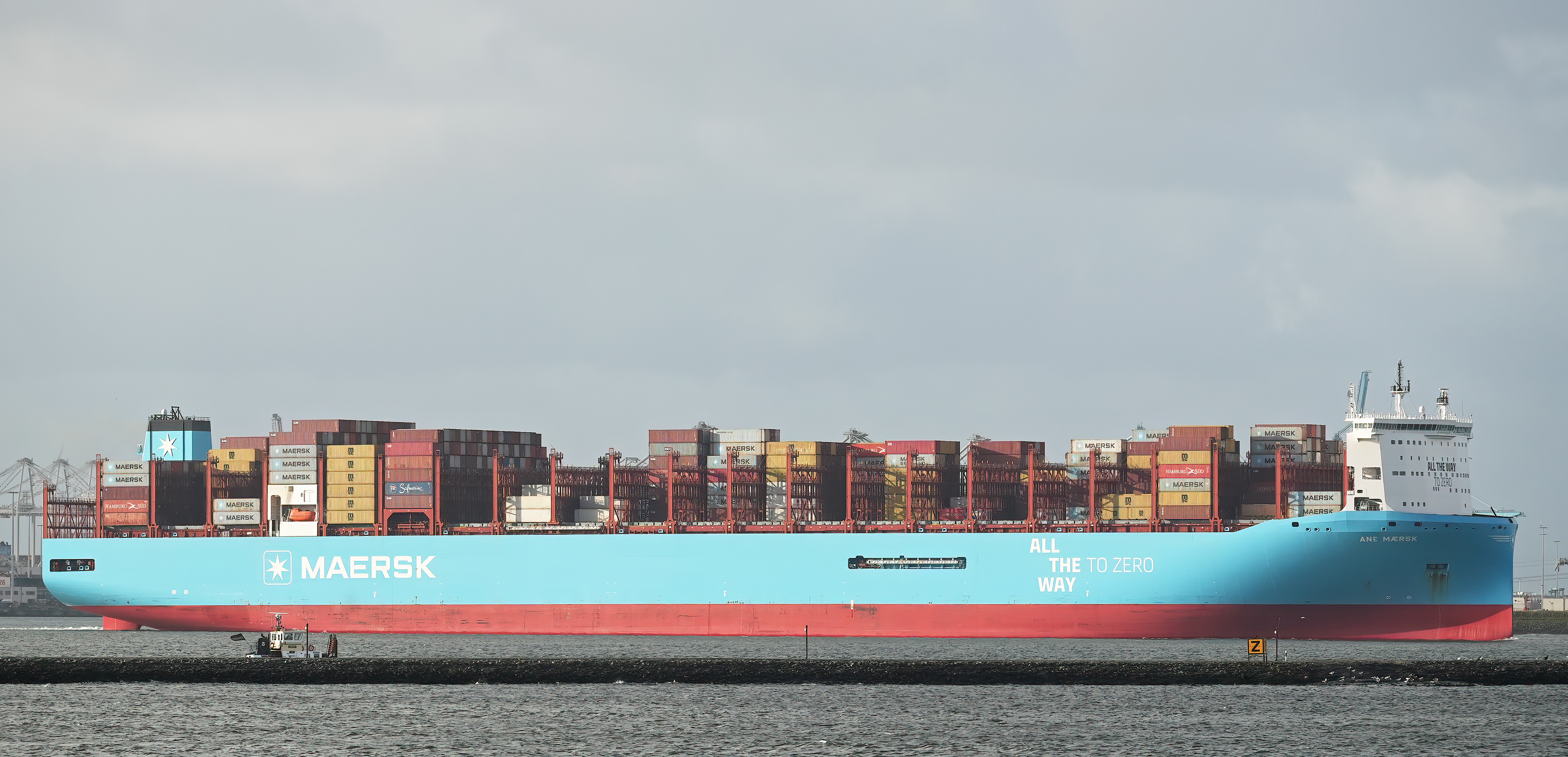
- Ane Maersk, the eponymous A-class container ship at the Port of Rotterdam in November 2024

Class overview
- Builders: Hyundai Heavy Industries
- Operators: Maersk Line
- In service: 2024–present
- Planned: 12
- Completed: 12
- Active: 12

General characteristics
- Type: Container ship
- Tonnage: 172,093 GT
- Length: 350.59 m (1,150 ft 3 in)
- Beam: 54.00 m (177 ft 2 in)
- Propulsion: Dual fuel
- Capacity: 16,000 TEU

The new Maersk A class III is a series of 12 container ships built for Maersk Line by Hyundai Heavy Industries. The ships are the first dual fuel container ship class (after the smaller Laura Maersk), and the second largest container ships capable of running on methanol. The ships are unusual in having the bridge at the front of the ship, not near the middle or rear as most large ships.

== List of ships ==
Ship	Yard number	IMO number	Delivery	Status	ref
Ane Maersk		9948748	26 January 2024	In service	
Astrid Maersk		9948750	4 April 2024	In service	
Antonia Maersk		9948762	May; 2024	In service	
Alette Maersk		9948774	June; 2024	In service	
Alexandra Maersk		9948786	9 October 2024	In service	
Angelica Maersk		9948798	October 2024	In service	
A. P. Møller		9948803	28 November 2024	In service	
Adrian Maersk		9948815	15 January 2025	In service	
Albert Maersk		9961805	1 February 2025	In service	
Alva Maersk		9961817	24 February 2025	In service	
Arthur Maersk		9961829	14 April 2025	In service	
Axel Maersk		9961831	30 May 2025	In service	

== Lego model of ship ==
In March 2026, Lego released a set based on the A-class ship Ane Maersk, called Maersk Dual-Fuel Container Vessel. Lego has been releasing Maersk sets since 1974 and this set marks the eleventh set and the first since 2014.

== See also ==
- Maersk B class container ship
- Maersk Triple E-class container ship
- Maersk E-class container ship
- Maersk H-class container ship
- Maersk Edinburgh-class container ship
- Gudrun Maersk-class container ship
- Maersk M-class container ship
- Maersk C-class container ship
