= Gudrun Mærsk =

Container ship

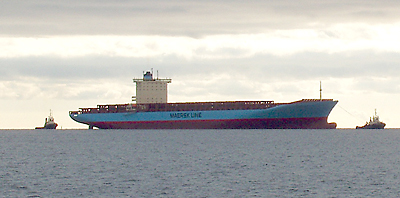
- The "Gunvor Maersk" container ship of the "Gudrun Maersk" class.

History

Denmark
- Name: Gudrun Maersk
- Operator: Maersk Line
- Builder: Odense Steel, Denmark
- Completed: 2005
- Status: in service
- Notes: Call sign: OYAU2; IMO number: 9302877; MMSI number: 220379000

General characteristics
- Class & type: Gudrun Maersk-class container ship
- Tonnage: 115,700 metric tons (deadweight tonnage); 97,933 GT (gross tonnage)
- Length: 366.9 m (1,204 ft)
- Beam: 42.8 m (140 ft)
- Draft: 14.5 m (48 ft)
- Propulsion: Wärtsilä 12RT-flex96c, 68,640 kW at 102 rpm
- Speed: 24 knots (44 km/h) (maximum); 23.2 knots (43 km/h) (cruising)
- Capacity: 11,078

Gudrun Maersk is a container ship, capable of carrying 8,500 TEU and with a deadweight (DWT) of 115,700 metric tons. The ship was built in 2005 and is operated by the Maersk Line.

== Design ==
The container vessel Gudrun Maersk was constructed at the Odense Steel shipyard in Denmark and launched in 2005. At the time it was the world's largest container vessel, a title it lost in 2006 to the Emma Maersk. The Gudrun Maersk has a capacity of 8,500 TEU. The length of the vessel is 367 m (1,204 ft) and the beam is 43 m (141 ft). The vessel's deadweight is 115,700 metric tons with a gross tonnage of 97,933. The maximum power of the Sulzer 12RT-flex96C low-speed common rail main engine of Gudrun Maersk is 68,640 kW (93,211 bhp)at 102 rpm. Gudrun and her 5 sister ships use exhaust heat recovery and cogeneration, producing 6 MWe and reducing the need for diesel generators.

== See also ==
- Emma Maersk
- Hannover Bridge
- NYK Vega
