= Axel Mærsk =

Danish merchant container ship

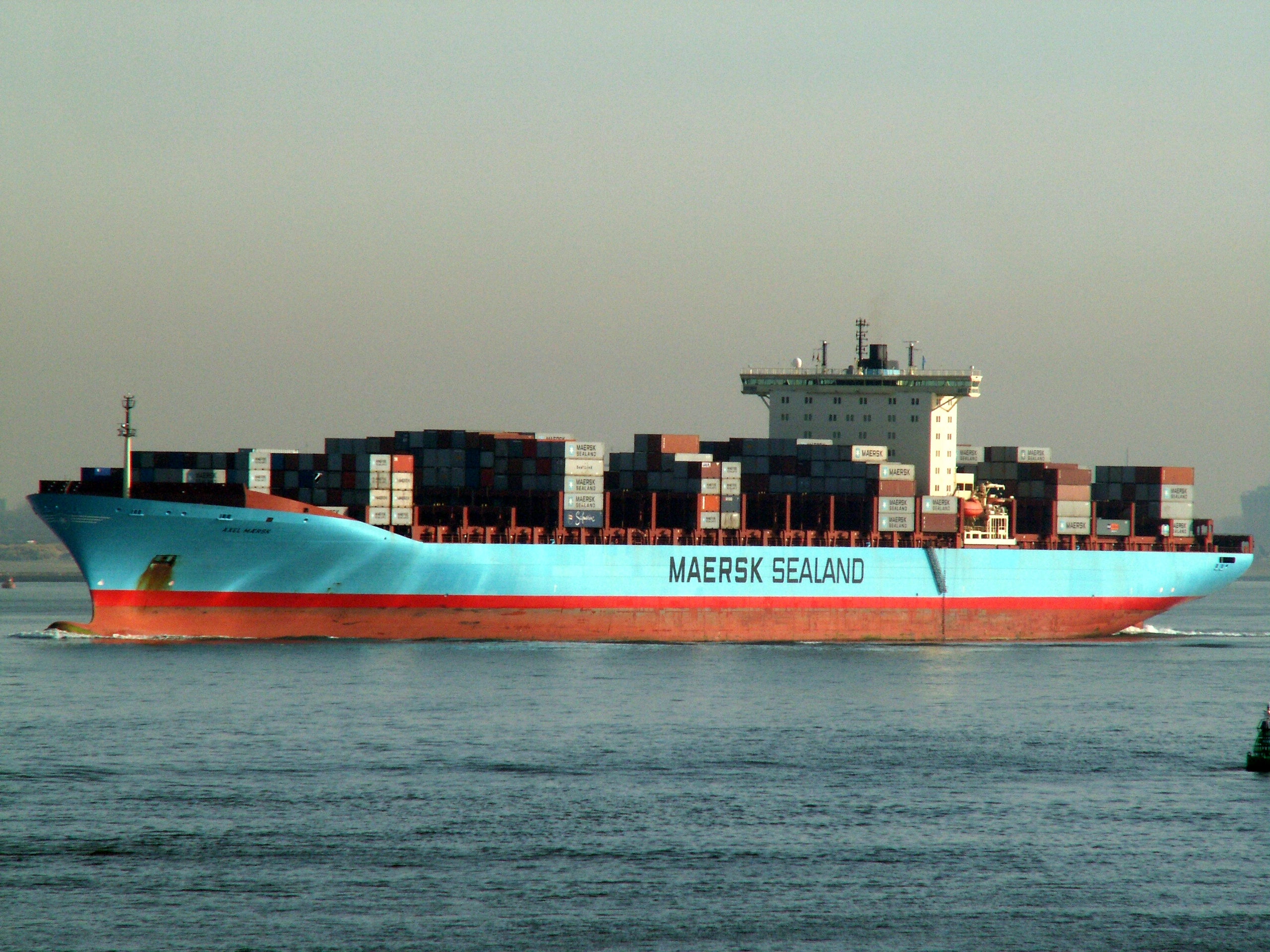

History

Denmark
- Name: GSL Lydia (former Axel Maersk)
- Operator: A. P. Moller-Maersk Group
- Ordered: 2002
- Builder: Lindo Shipyards
- Launched: 19 January 2003
- Status: Currently in service
- Notes: Call sign: OUUY2; IMO number: 9260419; MMSI number: 220187000

General characteristics
- Class & type: A-class container ship
- Tonnage: 109,000 DWT; 93,496 GT
- Length: 352 m (1,154 ft 10 in)
- Beam: 43 m (141 ft 1 in)
- Propulsion: HSD Sulzer 12RTA96C engine; 76,200 hp (56,800 kW)
- Speed: 25.4 knots (47 km/h) (maximum); 23.9 knots (44 km/h) (cruising)
- Capacity: 9,000 containers (company statistics); 9,350 containers (IMO calculations)

GSL Llydia, formerly Axel Maersk, is a Danish container ship and part of the fleet of the Maersk Line. A new ship in the Maersk fleet from the new Maersk A class, received the name Axel Maersk.

== Design ==
The container ship Axel Maersk was built in 2003 in the ship-yard of the Maersk Line in Odense, Denmark. The flag of Axel Maersk is also in Denmark. Axel Maersk was ordered in 2002 and completed in the beginning of 2003. The MMSI of the ship is 220187000, the IMO number is 9260419 and the call sign is OUUY2. The ship has a length of 352.00 m (1,154.86 ft) and a beam of 43.00 m (141.08 ft). The deadweight of the ship is 109,000 metric tons with a gross tonnage of 93,496.

The ship has a capacity of more than 9,000 TEUs. She is powered by a HDS Sulzer 12RTA96C engine with a power of 76,200 hp (56,800 kW) which gives a maximum speed of 25.4 knots and 23.9 knots (44.3 km/h) cruising speed.
