= Märchen =

Märchen is the German diminutive of the obsolete German word Mär, meaning "news, tale" (see Märchen). It may refer to:

- A fairy tale, a type of short story that typically features folkloric characters, such as fairies, goblins, elves, trolls, dwarves, giants or gnomes, and usually magic or enchantments
- A type of musical composition
  - The Russian composer Nikolai Medtner wrote many examples for solo piano (1880–1951), his original Russian title for the pieces Skazki is often replaced by Märchen
  - Märchenbilder (Schumann) for viola and piano, by Robert Schumann

Märchen or Marchen may also refer to:

- Marchen script, used for writing the Zhang-Zhung language
  - Marchen (Unicode block)
- Marchen Maersk, Danish container ship
- Märchen (album), a 2010 story album by the Japanese musical group Sound Horizon
- The Green Snake and the Beautiful Lily (German: Märchen), German fairy tale
- Marchen face, face type used in 205 series
