= Maersk Eindhoven =

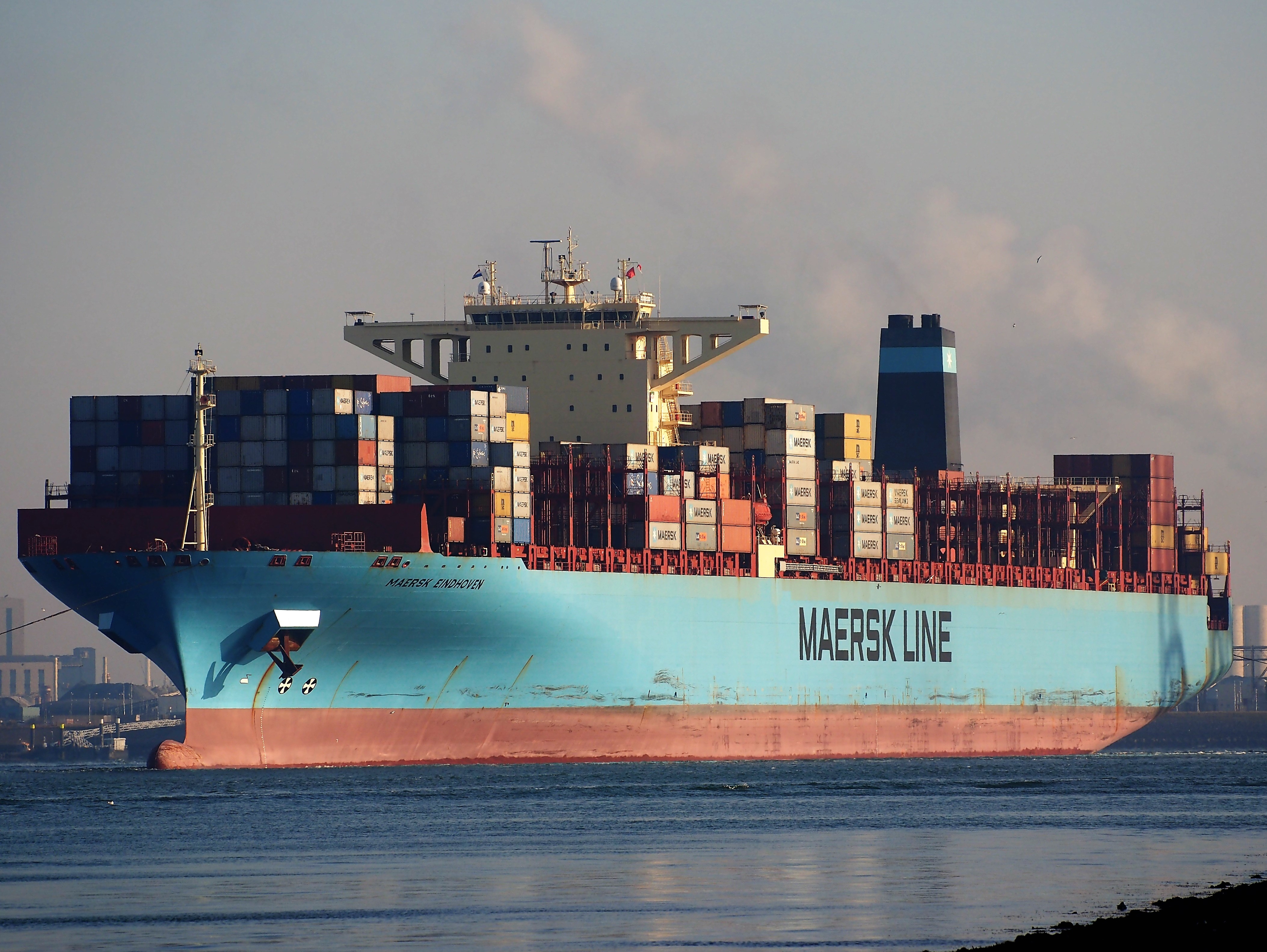
- Maersk Eindhoven

History
- Name: Maersk Eindhoven
- Operator: Maersk Line
- Builder: Hyundai Heavy Industries, Ulsan, South Korea
- Yard number: 2152
- Laid down: 29 March 2010
- Launched: 25 June 2010
- Completed: 16 August 2010
- Status: In service
- Notes: Call sign: V7UQ7; IMO number: 9456771; MMSI number: 538004006

General characteristics
- Class & type: Maersk Edinburgh-class container ship
- Tonnage: 141,716 GT; 59,810 NT; 142,105 DWT
- Length: 366.46 m (1,202 ft 4 in)
- Beam: 48.20 m (158.1 ft)
- Draft: 15.5 m (50 ft 10 in)
- Depth: 29.85 m (97 ft 11 in)
- Installed power: Hyundai-Wärtsilä 12RT-flex96C-B (68,640 kW (92,050 hp))
- Propulsion: Fixed-pitch propeller
- Speed: 24.7 knots (45.7 km/h; 28.4 mph) (maximum); 23.1 knots (42.8 km/h; 26.6 mph) (cruising)
- Capacity: 13,092 TEU (company statistics)

Maersk Eindhoven is a container ship in the Maersk Line fleet. The vessel was built in 2010 by Hyundai Heavy Industries in the Ulsan, South Korea ship-yard. The ship is named after the Dutch city of Eindhoven.

== Design ==
=== General characteristics ===
The ship has a total length of 366 m (1,200 ft 9 in), a beam of 48.20 m (158 ft 2 in) and draft of 15.5 m (50 ft 10 in). The deadweight tonnage of Maersk Eindhoven is 142,105 metric tons and the gross tonnage of the ship is 141,716.

=== Power and propulsion ===
The Maersk Eindhoven is powered by a single Hyundai-Wärtsilä 12RT-flex96C-B low-speed two-stroke crosshead diesel engine. It has a total power of 68,640 kilowatts (92,050 hp) at 102 rpm and auxiliary diesel generators with a power output of 2,700 kW (3,600 hp). The ship also has a 300 kW (400 hp) emergency diesel generator. It burns heavy fuel oil with a 12,400 cubic metres (440,000 cu ft) and 500 cubic metres (18,000 cu ft) of machine diesel oil. Its range is 29,700 nautical miles (55,000 km; 34,200 mi).
