= Clementine Maersk =

Container ship built in 2002

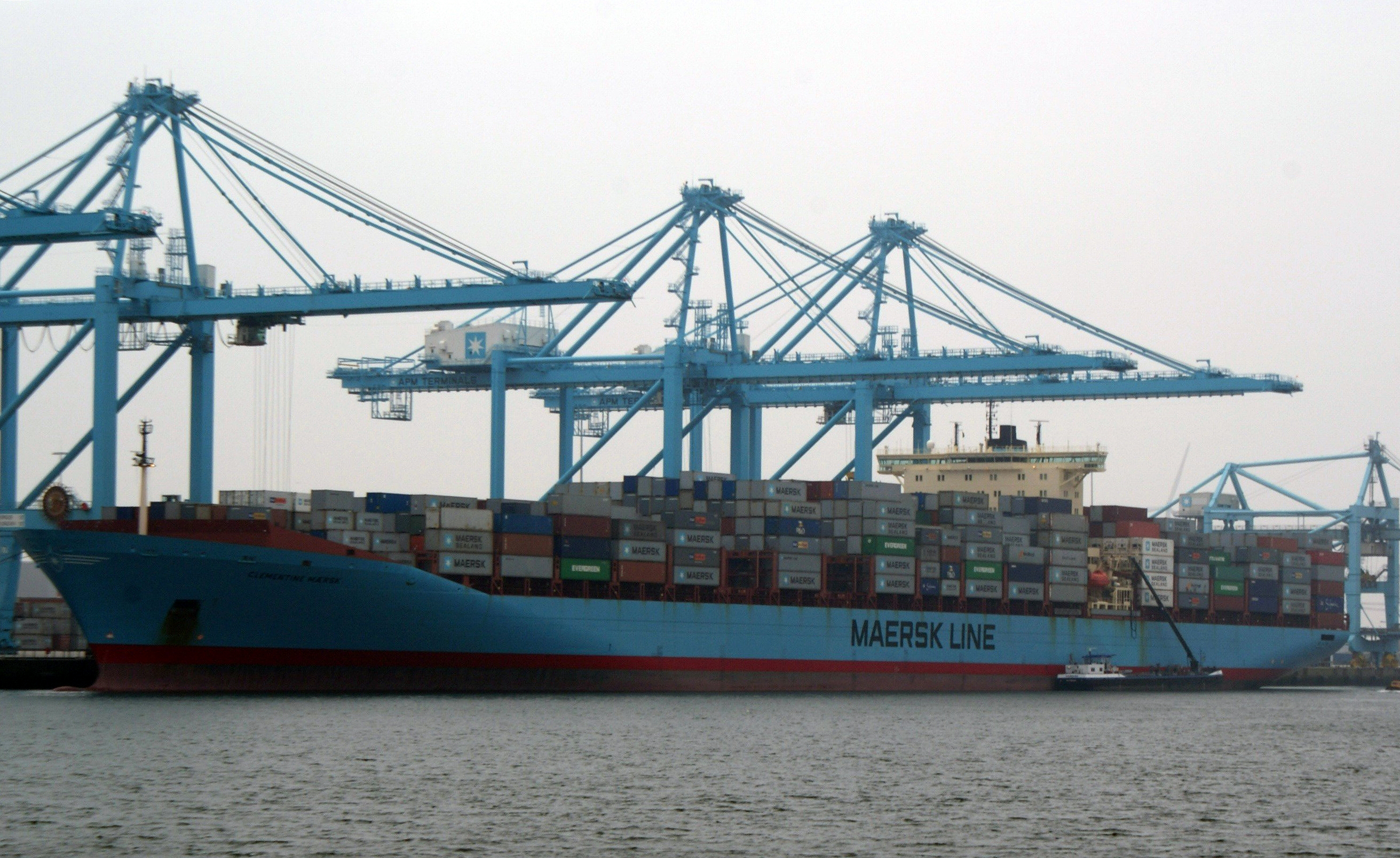

History
- Name: Clementine Maersk
- Operator: Maersk Line
- Builder: Odense Steel Shipyard
- Launched: 2 October 2002
- Status: Currently in service
- Notes: Call sign: OUQK2; IMO number: 9245770; MMSI number: 220164000

General characteristics
- Class & type: Maersk C-class container ship
- Tonnage: 109,696 metric tons (deadweight tonnage); 91,921 GT; 53,625 net tons
- Length: 347.00 m (1,138.45 ft)
- Beam: 43.00 m (141.08 ft)
- Draft: 14.50 m (47.6 ft)
- Propulsion: FORGED STEEL-ABS-GRADE 4C engine; 63,000 kW
- Speed: 25.6 knots (47.4 km/h; 29.5 mph) (maximum); 24.2 knots (cruising)
- Capacity: 6,600 containers (company statistics); 8,850 TEU (IMO calculations)

Clementine Maersk is a container ship of the Maersk Line. The ship was built in 2002 in the shipyard of Odense Steel and has a capacity of 6,600 TEUs according to company statistics and calculations.

== Design ==
Clementine Maersk was built in 2002 in the ship-yard of Odense Steel in Denmark and sails under the Danish flag. Clementine Maersk has a deadweight of 109,696 metric tons and a gross tonnage of 91,921 gross tons. The ship has a net tonnage of 53,625 net tons and a cargo capacity of 6,600 container (TEU). The length of the vessel is 347.00 meters, while the moulded beam is 43.00 meters. When the ship is fully loaded with cargo she reaches the maximum draft of 14,50 meters.
