= CMA CGM Medea =

South Korea-built French cargo ship

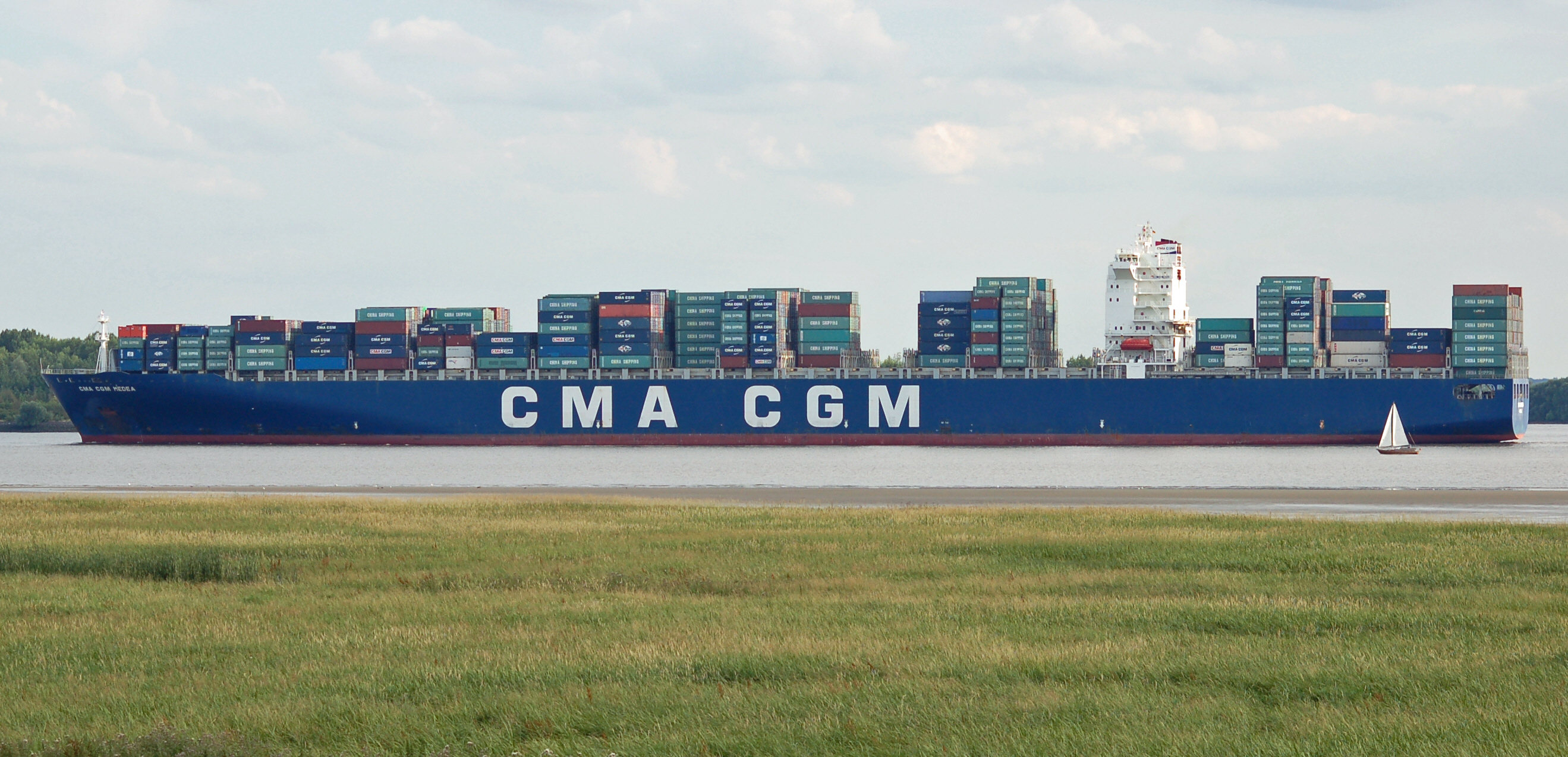
- CMA CGM Medea

History
- Name: CMA CGM Medea
- Operator: CMA CGM Ship Management
- Port of registry: France, Marseille
- Builder: Hyundai Samho
- Yard number: S255
- Laid down: 12 December 2005
- Launched: 9 March 2006
- Completed: 1 May 2006
- Identification: Call sign: FMFR; IMO number: 9299800; MMSI number: 635010200
- Status: In service

General characteristics
- Type: Container ship
- Tonnage: 107,711 GT; 50,109 NT; 113,909 DWT
- Length: 350 m (1,148 ft 4 in)
- Beam: 43 m (141 ft 1 in)
- Draught: 14.5 m (47 ft 7 in)
- Propulsion: Man B&W 12K98MC engine
- Speed: 25.4 knots (47 km/h) (maximum)
- Capacity: 9,415 containers

CMA CGM Medea is a container ship built in 2006.

== Design ==
CMA CGM Medea was built in 2006 in the shipyard of Hyundai Heavy Industries. She is 350 m (1,148 ft 4 in) long and has a beam of 43 m (141 ft 1 in). The draft, while the ship is fully loaded can reach a maximum of 14.5 m (47 ft 7 in). The ship has a deadweight tonnage of 113,909 metric tons and a gross tonnage of 107,711 gross tons. The net tonnage of CMA CGM Medea is 50,109 net tons. The vessel has a capacity for 9,415 TEU containers, according to company calculations.

== Engine equipment ==
The main engine installed on board of CMA CGM Medea is a MAN B&W 12K98MC. This produces a cruising speed of 23.2 knots (43.0 km/h; 26.7 mph), with a maximum speed of 25.4 knots (47.0 km/h; 29.2 mph). In addition the ship has two bow thrusters with power of 2,500 kW (3,400 hp) each, for added manoeuvrability in ports.

== Bridge equipment ==
The bridge equipment consists of GPS, dGPS, Automatic Identification System (AIS) and Automatic Radar Plotting Aid (ARPA), which usually allows the position of the ship to be plotted with an accuracy of 100 metres (330 ft). The electronic chart system, ECDIS, plots the ship's position against nautical charts automatically. The information from the AIS, ARPA and radar is used to allow the bridge crew to accurately plot the positions of other ships in the vicinity.

== See also ==
- Emma Mærsk
- Hannover Bridge
- NYK Vega
