= Sovereign Maersk =

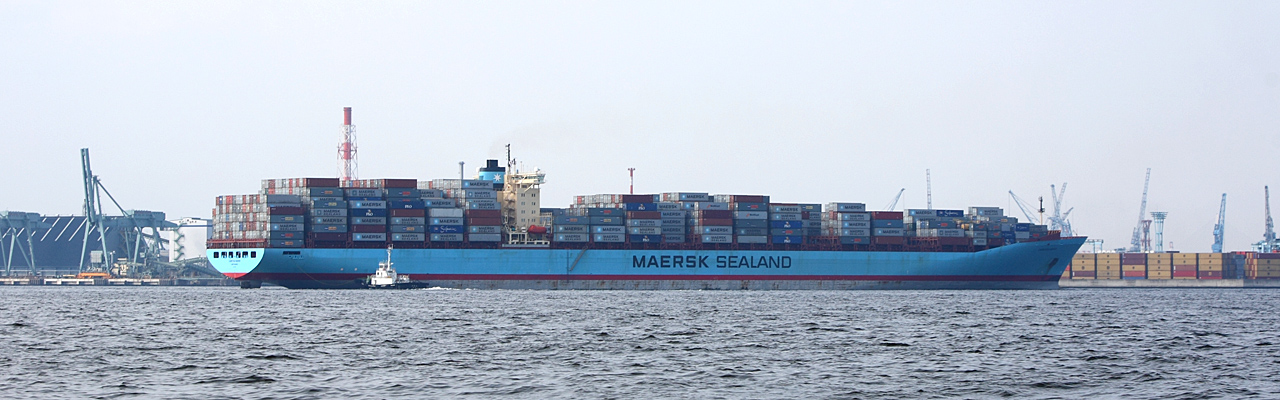
- Sovereign Mærsk at the Port of Yokohama

History

Denmark
- Name: Sovereign Maersk
- Operator: Ap Moller Maersk
- Laid down: 14 March 1997
- Launched: 31 July 1997
- Completed: 17 September 1997
- Status: In service
- Notes: Call sign: OYGA2; IMO number: 9120841; MMSI number: 219476000

General characteristics
- Class & type: Sovereign Maersk-class container ship
- Tonnage: 91,560 GT; 104,690 DWT
- Length: 346 m (1,135 ft)
- Beam: 42.80 m (140.4 ft)
- Draught: 14.5 m (48 ft)
- Installed power: MAN B&W 12K90 (56,000 kW)
- Speed: 24.7 knots (45.7 km/h; 28.4 mph) (maximum); 21.0 knots (38.9 km/h; 24.2 mph) (cruising)
- Capacity: 8,160 TEU

Sovereign Maersk is container ship, which is part of the fleet of Maersk Line. The container vessel is operated by AP Moller Maersk Denmark and built in 1997 in the shipyard of Odense Steel Shipyard.

== Design ==
The Sovereign Maersk was built in 1997 in Odense Steel Shipyard and when built was the largest container ship in the world. The container ship is one of the largest Maersk Line ships with overall length of 347.0 m (1,138.5 ft), beam of 44 m (144 ft) and depth of 21.00 m (68.90 ft). The draft of the cargo ship, when is fully loaded can reach 14.5 m (48 ft). The container vessel has deadweight of 104,690 metric tons, gross tonnage of 91,560, and capacity of 8,160 TEUs. The main engine MAN B&W 12K90 has output power of 56,000 kW, which is transferred through propulsion system to the propeller and the gives maximum speed of the ship of over 24.7 knots (45.7 km/h; 28.4 mph).
