= Maersk Honam =

Container ship

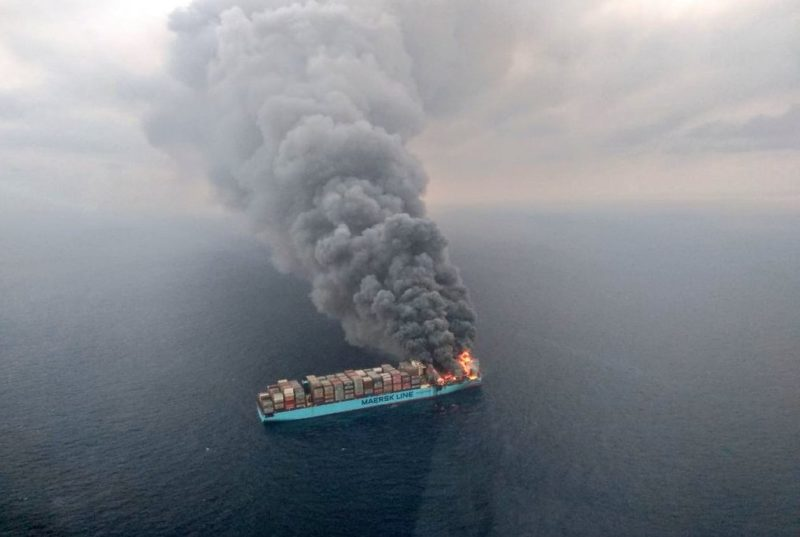
- Maersk Honam on fire in March 2018

History
- Name: Maersk Honam (2017–2019); Maersk Halifax (2019–present)
- Owner: A P Moller Singapore Pte Ltd, Singapore
- Operator: Maersk Line
- Port of registry: Singapore
- Ordered: 8 July 2015
- Builder: Hyundai Heavy Industries, Ulsan, South Korea
- Cost: US$137,500,000
- Yard number: 2873
- Laid down: 10 December 2015
- Launched: 12 May 2017
- Completed: 31 August 2017
- In service: 2017–2018; 2019–present
- Refit: 2018–2019
- Identification: IMO number: 9784271; MMSI number: 563030500; Call sign: 9V5395
- Status: Damaged by fire on 6 March 2018, but now in active service as Maersk Halifax

General characteristics (as built)
- Class & type: Maersk H-class container ship
- Tonnage: 153,153 GT; 70,694 NT; 162,051 DWT
- Length: 353.02 m (1,158 ft 2 in)
- Beam: 53.5 m (175 ft 6 in)
- Draught: 15 m (49 ft 3 in)
- Depth: 29.9 m (98 ft 1 in)
- Installed power: MAN B&W 8G95ME-C9.5 (54,960 kW)
- Propulsion: Single shaft; fixed pitch propeller
- Speed: 24 knots (44 km/h; 28 mph)
- Capacity: 15,226 TEU
- Crew: 27

Maersk Honam was a container ship operated by Maersk Line. The vessel caught fire on 6 March 2018 while sailing in the Arabian Sea. Five members of the crew of 27 were killed, including one rescued crew member who died later from injuries.

== Description ==
Maersk Honam is a fully cellular container ship with a capacity of 15,226 twenty-foot equivalent units (TEU). Her general configuration follows that of similarly sized container ships with deckhouse about two thirds forwards to improve visibility over container stacks, engine room aft, and container stowage in nine cargo holds as well as on deck. She is 340.5 metres (1,117 ft 2 in) long overall, has a moulded beam of 53.5 metres (175 ft 6 in), and fully laden draws 15 metres (49 ft 3 in) of water. Her gross tonnage is 153,153; net tonnage 70,694; and deadweight tonnage 162,051 tonnes. Maersk Honam is powered by a single license-built 8-cylinder MAN B&W 8G95ME-C9.5 low-speed crosshead diesel engine producing 54,960 kW (73,700 hp) at 80 rpm and driving a single fixed pitch bronze propeller.

== History ==
Maersk Honam was built by Hyundai Heavy Industries in Ulsan, South Korea, as part of a US$1.1 billion contract for the construction of nine container ships with a nominal capacity of 14,000 TEU for Maersk Line. These so-called H-class vessels were designed with improved operational flexibility compared to older designs, meaning that they were not optimized for a particular route. The shipbuilding contract was signed on 8 July 2015 and the keel of the vessel was laid on 10 December with yard number 2873. She was launched on 12 May 2017 and delivered to Maersk's Singapore subsidiary, A P Moller Singapore Pte Ltd, on 31 August.

=== 2018 fire ===
On 6 March 2018 at about 14:45 GMT, a major fire broke out in the No.3 forward cargo hold of Maersk Honam while the vessel was in the Arabian Sea about 900 nautical miles (1,700 km; 1,000 mi) southeast of Salalah, Oman, en route from Singapore to Suez. At the time, she was carrying a cargo of 7,860 containers and a crew of 27: thirteen Indian, nine Filipino, two Thai, one Romanian, one South African, and one British nationals. The crew attempted to extinguish the fire using the ship's CO_{2} fire suppression system and other fire-fighting equipment, but were unable to do so. A distress signal was sent at 15:55 GMT and the crew eventually abandoned ship at roughly 17:15 GMT using the ship's life rafts and one lifeboat. 23 crew members were evacuated to a nearby merchant vessel, ALS Ceres, while the remaining four (two Filipino, one Indian and the South African) were declared missing. Two of the rescued crew members required urgent medical attention and the other, a Thai national, died from his injuries on the following day. Three injured crew members were later moved to the Indian Coast Guard vessel ICGS Shoor after their condition worsened. Maersk Line announced on 12 March that remains of three as-yet-unidentified crewmembers had been found on board, leaving one still officially missing who was later declared dead.

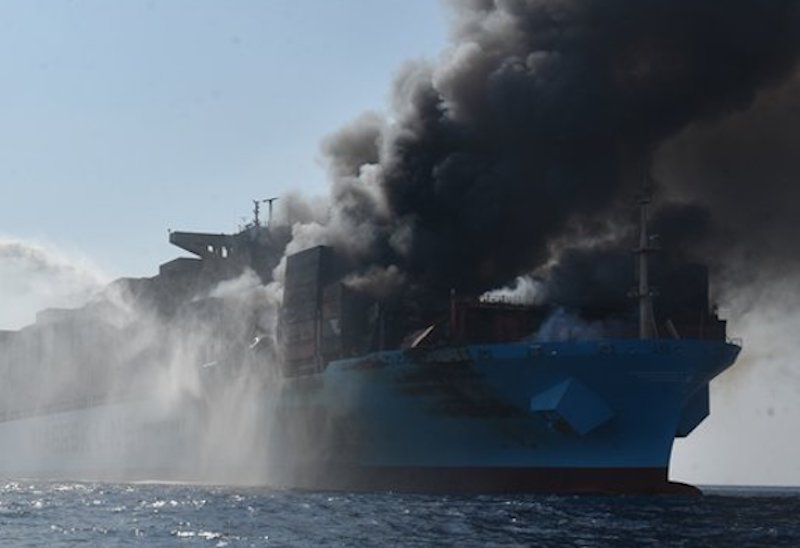
Smoke billows from the forward cargo holds of the Maersk Honam

On 9 March, the fire on board the adrift Maersk Honam had reportedly been brought under control by the ICGS Shoor and two offshore vessels, CSC Nelson and Maersk Involver. The salvage operation was led by Smit Salvage.

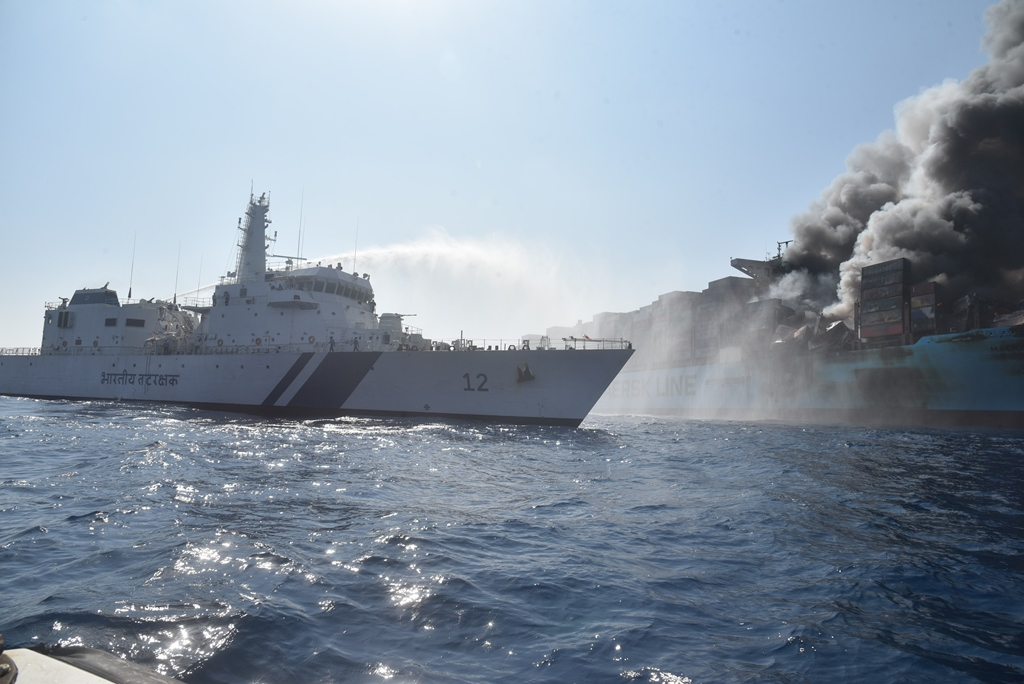
ICGS Shoor spraying water on the fire

The fire continued to burn, albeit controlled, into April, by which time the ship had been taken under tow to the Port of Jebel Ali for the unloading of intact cargo.

To recover costs, the ship's owner declared general average, a long-held principle where cargo owners are expected to pay a fraction of their shipment's value to compensate salvage efforts. The value decided by an adjustor amounted to a salvage security of 42.5% of cargo value in addition to an 11.5% deposit, meaning owners of the remaining cargo had to pay a total of 54% of their cargo's value before being able to take possession of it.

==== Investigation ====
An investigation by Singapore's Transport Safety Investigation Bureau (TSIB) concluded in October 2020. No cause was conclusively determined. The TSIB report concluded that the 1,000 tonnes of sodium dichloroisocyanurate dihydrate (SDID), a powerful oxidiser, stored in 54 containers in the No.3 cargo hold, could be one potential cause of the fire. Electrical faults, fuel tank heating, misdeclaration of goods, and another cargo ignition source were ruled out as potential causes. SDID is classified under Class 9 in the International Maritime Dangerous Goods Code (IMDG), instead of the more stringent IMDG Class 5.1 (oxidising substances). However, the report stated that this classification may have been due to testing of SDID only in relatively small quantities, and the potential for a runaway decomposition of SDID when packed closely in a shipping container could be much higher—particularly if any water had made its way into the cargo. This possibility was ruled out and not recognized in the IMDG code. However, better placement of SDID (above deck) is recommended. Crewmembers responding to the fire reported difficulty breathing, thick white smoke, and the smell of bleach. A Maersk uniform recovered from the ship was bleached nearly white from its previous blue color. This could be consistent with chlorine emitted from an SDID burn-off but could also come from many other things given the extreme temperatures generated in a fire like this. Combustion of SDID could also have released other gases including trichloroamine, cyanogen chloride, or phosgene, all of which are extremely hazardous. The report found shortcomings in the initial firefighting actions. Failure to correctly seal the relevant cargo hold (which rendered the CO_{2} shot less effective and allowed smoke to enter the accommodation area) was particularly relevant and a combination of crew error and poor ship design. Following the conclusion of the investigation, TSIB recommended additional temperature sensors in cargo holds, specially designed containers for IMDG goods, and a review of SOLAS fire-fighting standards for container ships.

=== Rebuilding ===
The owner decided to reuse the stern section in a new ship, to be constructed at a South Korean shipyard. The damaged bow section and the accommodations block were removed at Dubai Drydocks for scrapping. The stern section was taken from Jebel Ali to Geoje aboard the semi-submersible ship Xin Guang Hua, which sailed from Dubai in February 2019. Hyundai Heavy Industries constructed a new bow and accommodations block, and the rebuilt ship, renamed Maersk Halifax but retaining the IMO number of Maersk Honam, entered service in August 2019. Chinese reports list the rebuilt vessel as 1,204 feet (367 meters) in length; Maersk lists a nominal 15,262 TEU capacity.

=== Methanol propulsion ===
A conversion to a methanol-fueled propulsion began in 2023, and was completed at the Zhoushan Yatai Ship Engineering and Repair Co. in October 2024.

== See also ==
- Hyundai Fortune, a 5,551 TEU container ship that was seriously damaged in a fire in 2006
- MSC Flaminia, a 6,750 TEU container ship that caught fire in 2012 with loss of three crewmen
- MOL Comfort, a 8,110 TEU container ship that broke in two in June 2013; a fire broke out in the forward section before sinking
- Hansa Brandenburg, a 1,740 TEU container ship damaged by fire in July 2013
