= General average =

Maritime law

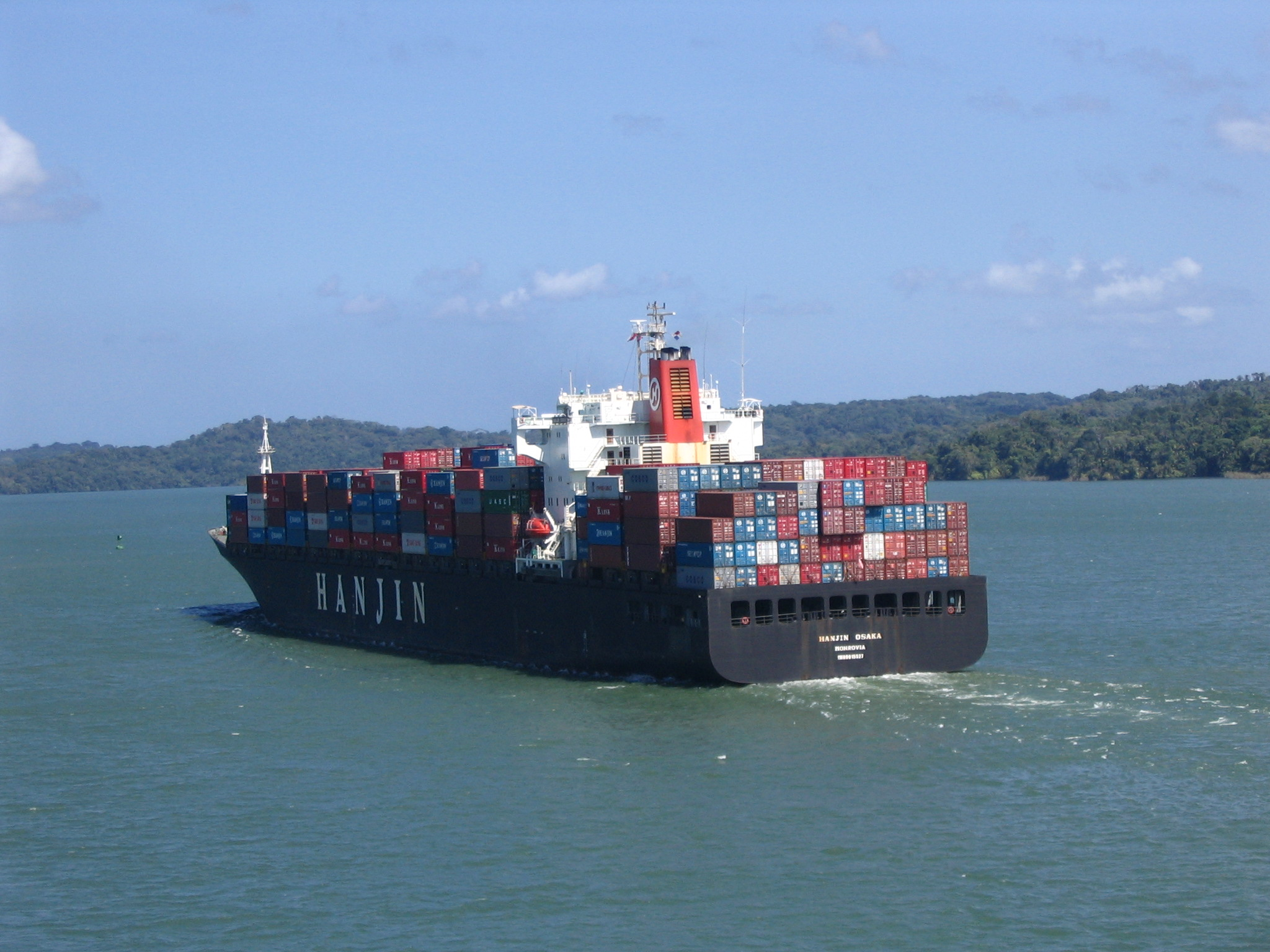
The owners of Hanjin Osaka, seen here transiting the Panama Canal in 2012, declared general average following an explosion.

The law of general average is a principle of maritime law whereby all stakeholders in a sea venture proportionately share any losses resulting from a voluntary sacrifice of part of the ship or cargo to save the whole in an emergency. For instance, should the crew jettison some cargo overboard to lighten the ship in a storm, the loss would be shared pro rata by both the carrier and the cargo-owners.

In the exigencies of hazards faced at sea, crew members may have little time in which to determine precisely whose cargo they are jettisoning. Thus, to avoid quarreling that could waste valuable time, there arose the equitable practice whereby all the merchants whose cargo landed safely would be called on to contribute a portion, based upon a share or percentage, to the merchant or merchants whose goods had been tossed overboard to avert imminent peril. General average traces its origins in ancient maritime law, and the principle remains within the admiralty law of most countries.

== Etymology ==
"Average" comes from French avarie and Italian avaria, tracing back to Arabic عَوَارِيَّة, ʕawāriyya, meaning "damaged goods". The use of the term in "general average" originally referred to incurred damages, but the meaning of the word developed into the additional modern senses of equitable distribution and arithmetic mean due to the principle.

== Ancient through early modern times ==
It is provided by the Lex Rhodia that if merchandise is thrown overboard for the purpose of lightening a ship, the loss is made good by the assessment of all which is made for the benefit of all.

— Julius Paulus, Opinions of Paulus (c. AD 230)

A form of what is now called general average was included in the Lex Rhodia, the Rhodes Maritime Code of c. 800 BC. Julius Paulus quoted from the law around the turn of the 3rd century, and these quotes are preserved, and an excerpt is included in Justinian's 6th-century Digest of Justinian (part of the Corpus Juris Civilis), although the Lex Rhodia is itself now lost.

After the fall of Rome, formal maritime law fell into disuse in Europe (maritime law scholar Jean Marie Pardessus suggests that the Digest of Justinian may have been entirely lost until a copy was discovered in Amalfi around 1135), although informal arrangements similar to the basic concept of general average was probably often followed as a practical matter. The medieval Rolls of Oléron, probably a collection of judgments from a court in Bordeaux, provided (along with much else) guidance on what is now called general average, and was taken as authoritative in many parts of Europe: the Laws of Wisbuy, as well as laws of Flanders, the Hanseatic League, Amsterdam, Genoa, and Catalonia, appear to have been copied from the Rolls of Oléron.

An ordinance published by King Louis XIV of France in 1681 influenced laws in the rest of Europe, with the definition used in the French code followed in similar terms in codes and ordinances promulgated in that century and the next in Hamburg, Prussia, Denmark, Sweden, Spain, Amsterdam, Rotterdam and Middelburg.

== York Antwerp Rules ==
=== The 1890 Rules ===
The first codification of general average was the York Antwerp Rules of 1890. American companies accepted it in 1949. General average requires three elements which are clearly stated by Justice Grier in Barnard v. Adams:

1st. A common danger: a danger in which vessel, cargo and crew all participate; a danger imminent and apparently "inevitable", except by voluntarily incurring the loss of a portion of the whole to save the remainder.

2nd. There must be a voluntary jettison, jactus, or casting away, of some portion of the joint concern for the purpose of avoiding this imminent peril, periculi imminentis evitandi causa, or, in other words, a transfer of the peril from the whole to a particular portion of the whole.

3rd. This attempt to avoid the imminent common peril must be successful.

The York-Antwerp Rules remain in effect, having been modified and updated several times since their 1890 introduction.

=== Modern Rules ===
The York Antwerp Rules were updated in 1994, 2004 and 2016. A summary of the 2004 changes may be found here:

The Hamburg Rules of 1978 provide for general average to apply to relevant costs incurred as a result of attempts to save life or property.

=== New Jason clause ===
United States law provides for taking the shipowner's fault into account, in contradiction of Rule D of the York–Antwerp Rules. Therefore, a New Jason Clause is often included in shipping contracts when US law may apply to the contract or trade. Such a clause specifies that shipowners will also be included in the general average even when the loss was caused by negligence of the shipowner or crew.

== Modern day ==
Despite advances in maritime transport technology, the principle continues on occasion to be invoked:

- The MV Hyundai Fortune declared general average following an explosion and fire in 2006 off the coast of Yemen.
- The M/V MSC Sabrina declared general average in effect after grounding in the Saint Lawrence river on 8 March 2008.
- The owners of the Hanjin Osaka declared general average following an explosion in the ship's engine room on 8 January 2012.
- Maersk declared general average for Maersk Honam after a fire in the Arabian Sea in March 2018.
- The owners of the Northern Jupiter declared general average following an engine fire on 28 January 2020.
- Shoei Kisen, the owners of the Ever Given, declared general average following the grounding of the vessel in the Suez Canal on 23 March 2021, resulting in a six-day shutdown of traffic in the canal until it was freed by 11 tugs and two dredgers.
- Evergreen Marine, the owners of the Ever Forward, declared general average on 31 March 2022 following the grounding of the vessel in Chesapeake Bay.
- The owners of the MV Dali, which hit and demolished the Key Bridge in Baltimore in 2024, declared General Average on the 17th April 2024
- General Average was declared on 28 November 2025 after the 21 November fire aboard M/V ONE HENRY HUDSON in Los Angeles.

== See also ==
- Protection and indemnity insurance clubs
