= Gunde Maersk =

Danish container ship

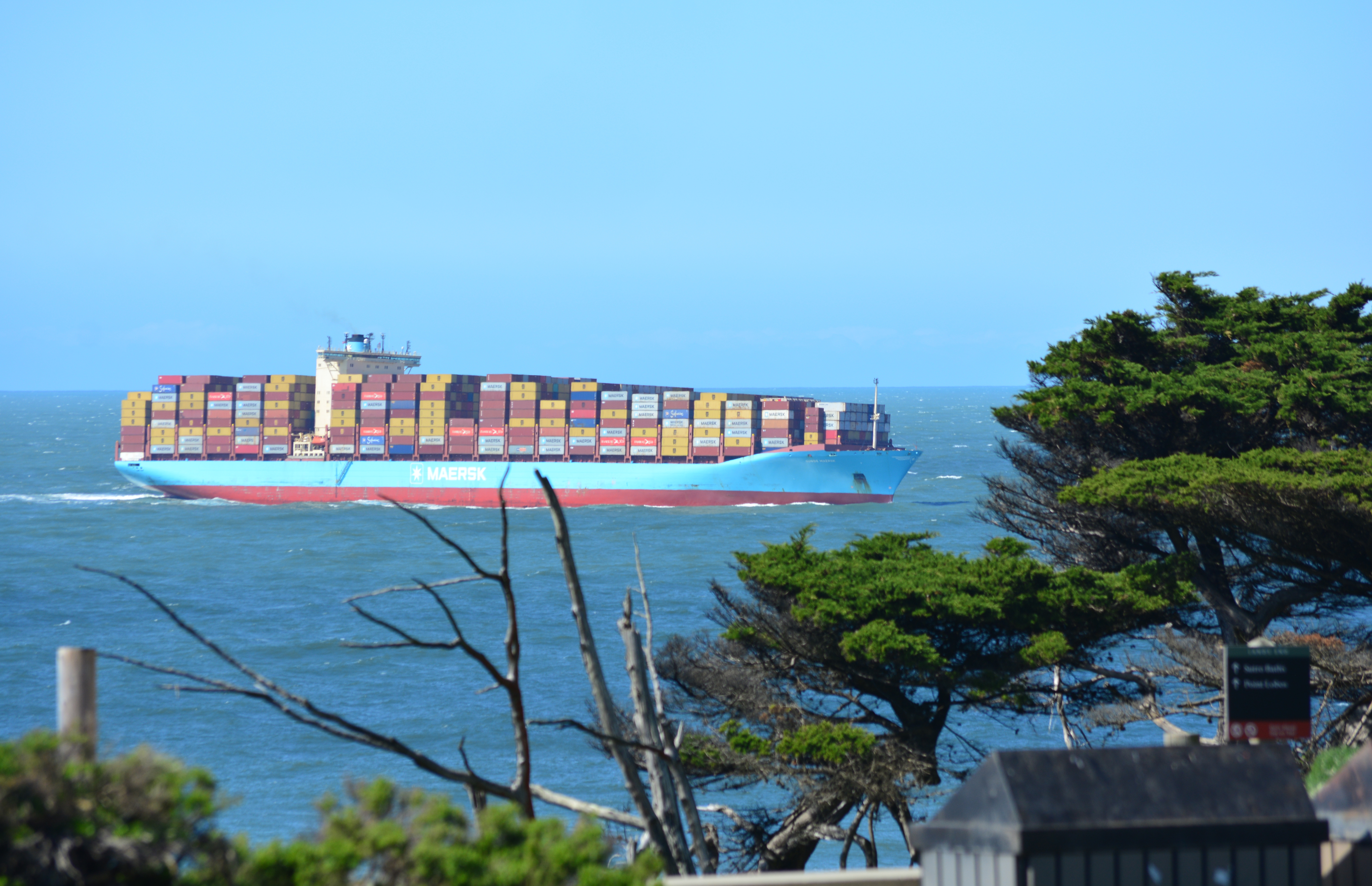
- Gunde Maersk off of Lands End, San Francisco, 2025

History
- Name: Marchen Maersk (2008-2014); Gunde Maersk (2014-present)
- Owner: A.P. Moller Maersk
- Operator: Maersk Line
- Port of registry: Dragør, Denmark
- Builder: Odense Steel Shipyard
- Yard number: 212
- Launched: 28 March 2008
- Christened: 10 May 2008
- Completed: May 2008
- Identification: IMO number: 9359014; Call sign: OUIY2; MMSI number: 220594000; Official No: D4249
- Status: In service

General characteristics
- Class & type: Maersk M-class container ship
- Tonnage: 99,002 Gross Tons
- Length: 366.9m LOA
- Draught: 15.50m
- Depth: 21.45m
- Installed power: 68,640kW (93,323HP)
- Propulsion: Diesel, Single Screw
- Speed: 25.0 kn
- Capacity: 11,008 TEU

Gunde Maersk is owned and operated by the A.P. Moller Maersk. Gunde Maersk was one of the largest container ships in the world when she was built. The Gunde Maersk was christened on 10 May 2008 at Maersk Odense Steel Shipyard in Denmark.

== Hull and engine ==
Gunde Maersk is a fully cellular container ship with a capacity of 11,008 TEU. She was completed in May 2008 by the Odense Steel Shipyard, in yard 212 and has an overall length of 367 meters.

The ship is powered by a Wärtsilä 12RT-Flex96c, 2-stroke slow speed diesel engine which is capable of propelling the Marchen Maersk at a top speed of 25 knots.
