= MV Mærsk Boston =

Containership

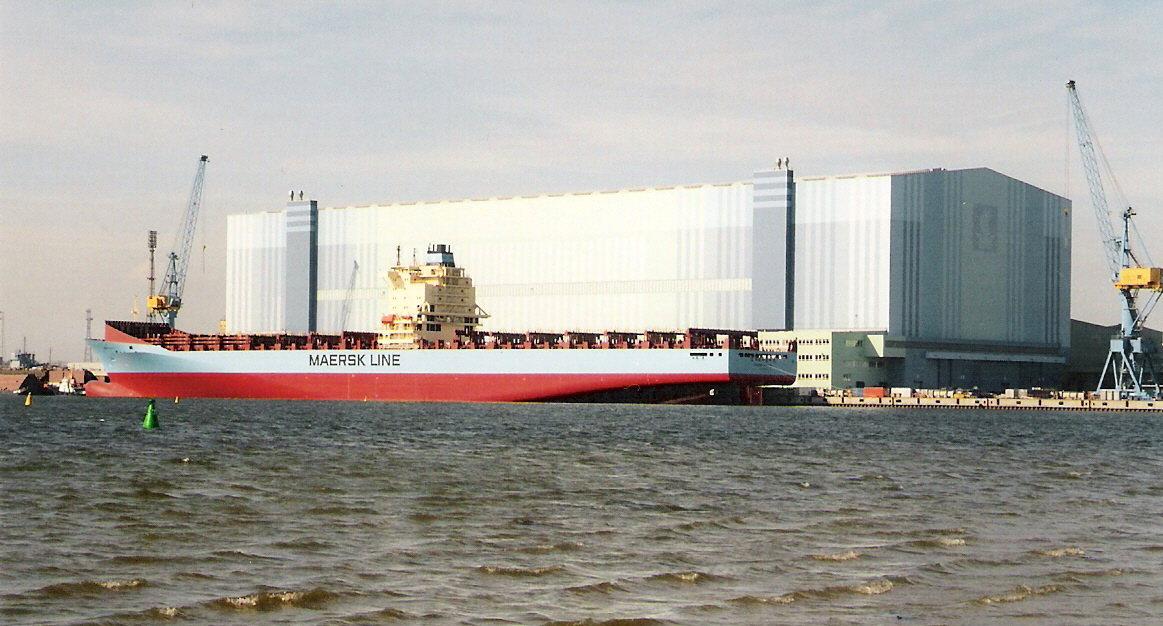
- Mærsk Boston before sea trials

History

Denmark
- Name: Maersk Boston
- Operator: Maersk Line
- Port of registry: København
- Builder: Volkswerft, Stralsund, Germany
- Yard number: 459
- Launched: 20 February 2006
- Completed: May 2006
- Notes: Call sign: OZDB2; IMO number: 9313905; MMSI: 219216000

General characteristics
- Class & type: container ship
- Tonnage: 48,853 GT; 53,634 DWT
- Length: 294 m (965 ft)
- Beam: 32 m (105 ft)
- Draft: 13 m (43 ft)
- Speed: 29 knots (54 km/h) (cruising)
- Capacity: 4,196 TEU
- Crew: 20

Maersk Boston is the first of the Maersk B-class of fast container ships. She was then called the "MV Boston", to reflect her charter to MSC in September 2010.

She has the capacity for approximately 4,000 containers and was designed for rapid transportation between China and the USA. Along with four of her sister ships, she was laid up in Loch Striven in Scotland.

== Design ==
Designed for high speed transportation between China and USA, Boston is 294 m (965 ft) long, with a beam of 32 m (105 ft) and a draft of 13 m (43 ft). She is designed to operate at 29 knots.

Operated by a crew of 20, the vessel has a gymnasium and hospital.

== History ==
Mærsk Boston was the first of a series of seven fast container ships built by Volkswerft in Germany for Maersk. Launched in 2006, MV Boston is registered in København. A downturn in the world economy means that the B-class vessels have never operated their intended route. Designed for a service speed of 29 kn, their fuel consumption (300 tonnes per day) makes them uneconomic. Reducing the operating speed to 12 kn, reduced fuel consumption to 50 tonnes per day. However the reduction in cargo being moved favours more economical vessels, such as Edith Mærsk.

Boston was rafted up in Loch Striven on the Clyde in Scotland, together with Mærsk Beaumont, Mærsk Bentonville and Mærsk Baltimore. After ten months, Boston left Loch Striven on 11 June 2010. Their older fleetmate, Sealand Performance left the raft on 21 May 2010. During the lay up, the raft was used to film a BBC children's TV show, Mission:2110, which premiered in May 2010.

== Sister ships ==
=== Maersk owned ===
Ship	Previous names	Yard number	IMO number	Delivery	Status	Notes	ref
Mærsk Baltimore			9313917	2006	In service		
Mærsk Brownsville			9313955	2007	In service		

=== New owner ===
Ship	Previous names	Yard number	IMO number	Delivery	Status	Notes	ref
MSC Rita V	Mærsk Brownsville		9313955	2007	In service		
MSC Iniya V	Mærsk Brocklyn		9313931	2007	In service		
MSC Leandra V	Mærsk Buffalo		9313943	2007	In service		
MSC Bremerhaven V	Mærsk Beaumont		9313967	2007	In service		
