= Maersk C-class container ship =

Container ship class

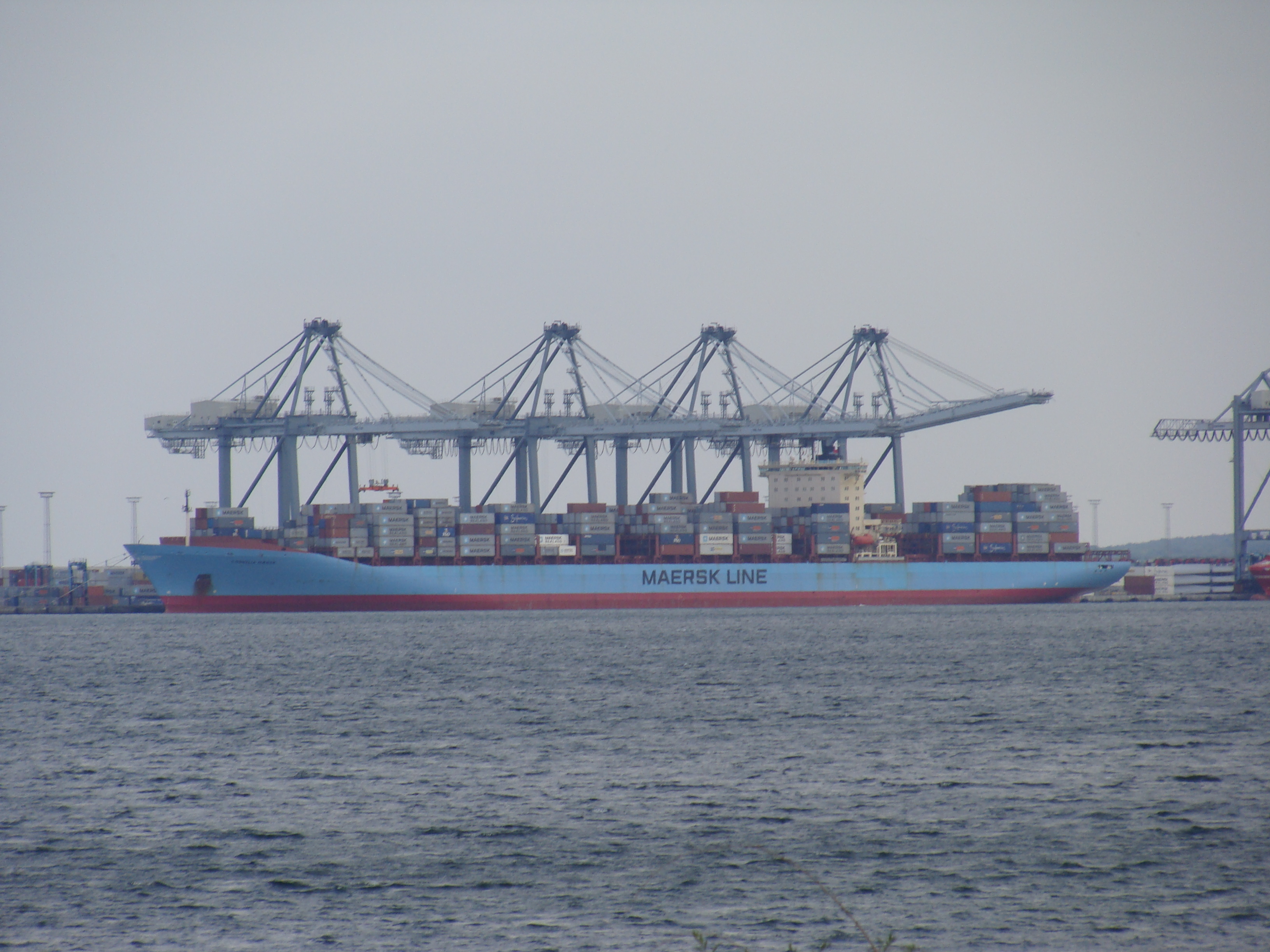
- Cornelia Maersk in the Port of Aarhus

Class overview
- Builders: Odense Steel Shipyard
- Operators: Maersk Line
- Preceded by: Sovereign Maersk-class container ship
- In service: 2000–present
- Planned: 8
- Completed: 8
- Active: 8

General characteristics (Upgraded)
- Type: Container ship
- Tonnage: 92,198 GT
- Length: 346.98 m (1,138.4 ft)
- Beam: 42.8 m (140 ft)
- Draft: 15 m (49 ft)
- Capacity: 9,640 TEU

General characteristics
- Type: Container ship
- Tonnage: 91,921 GT
- Length: 346.98 m (1,138.4 ft)
- Beam: 42.95 m (140.9 ft)
- Draft: 14.5 m (48 ft)
- Capacity: 8,650 TEU

The C class is a series of 8 container ships built for Maersk Line. The ships were built by Odense Steel Shipyard in Denmark and have a maximum theoretical capacity of around 9,640 twenty-foot equivalent units (TEU).

The last three ships were built with a slightly different design compared to the first five. Overall they are slightly wider and were built with a slightly taller bridge.

Between 2011 and 2016, five of the ships were upgraded at the Qingdao Beihai Shipbuilding Heavy Industry shipyard in China.

== List of ships ==
=== Maersk owned ===
Ship	Previous names	Yard number	IMO number	Delivery	Status	Notes	ref
Chastine Maersk		L180	9219800	3 Feb 2001	In service	Upgraded	
Charlotte Maersk		L181	9245744	22 Mar 2002	In service	Upgraded	
Cornelia Maersk		L182	9245756	12 Jun 2002	In service		
Columbine Maersk		L183	9245768	4 Sep 2002	In service		
Clementine Maersk		L184	9245770	7 Nov 2002	In service		

=== New owner ===
Ship	Previous names	Yard number	IMO number	Delivery	Status	Notes	ref
MSC NICOLE X	A.P. Moller (2000-2024)	L177	9214898	8 Jun 2000	In service	Upgraded	
MSC JASMINE X	Caroline Maersk (2000-2024)	L178	9214903	4 Sep 2000	In service	Upgraded	
MSC DENISSE X	Carsten Maersk (2000-2024)	L179	9219795	17 Nov 2000	In service	Upgraded	

== See also ==
- Maersk Triple E-class container ship
- Maersk E-class container ship
- Maersk H-class container ship
- Maersk Edinburgh-class container ship
- Gudrun Maersk-class container ship
- Maersk M-class container ship
