= Attacks on the MV Maersk Hangzhou =

Naval battle of Operation Prosperity Guardian

- Part of the Operation Prosperity Guardian and the Red Sea crisis
| Date | 30–31 December 2023 |
| Location | Red Sea, Gulf of Aden |
| Result | Houthi victory: Maersk pauses shipping through the Red Sea for 48 hours.; Houthis succeed in temporarily halting shipping.; U.S succeeds in sinking Houthi attack boats.; On January 2 Maersk announce a halt on all shipping through the Red Sea |

Belligerents
| Yemen (SPC) | United States |

Commanders and leaders
| Abdul-Malik al-Houthi | Marc Miguez |

Units involved
| Yemeni Navy (SPC): Houthis | United States Navy: Maersk private security contractors |

Strength
| Four fast attack craft Coastal missile batteries | One freighter One aircraft carrier Two destroyers |

Casualties and losses
| Three fast attack craft sunk 10 killed | One civilian freighter damaged |

On 30 December 2023, Houthi forces in the Gulf of Aden attacked the Maersk commercial vessel Maersk Hangzhou. Early the next day, Houthis again attacked the Maersk Hangzhou, attempting to board the freighter. The Maersk Hangzhou made a distress signal, to which U.S. Navy forces of the aircraft carrier USS Dwight D. Eisenhower and destroyer USS Gravely responded. The U.S., along with Maersk security personnel aboard the ship, repelled the attack. The U.S. sank three Houthi vessels, killing ten Houthis. Maersk announced a 48-hour pause on shipping through the Red Sea following the incident. On January 2 Maersk announced a halt on shipping through the Red Sea due to Houthi attacks.

== Background ==
With the start of the 2023 Israel–Hamas war, the Houthi-controlled Supreme Political Council declared its support for Hamas and began launching airstrikes on commercial ships transiting the Red Sea, especially in the Bab el-Mandeb, the narrow strait that connects the Red Sea to the Gulf of Aden. While the Houthis initially claimed to be targeting only commercial ships bound for Israeli ports or with some link to Israel, they soon began indiscriminately targeting vessels, attempting airstrikes on ships with no discernible Israeli ties. The Maersk Hangzhou had previously docked in Haifa, Israel multiple times including most recently in October 2023. However, it was not bound for Israel when it was attacked. Currently, its destination at the time of the attack is unknown. To launch attacks on Red Sea shipping, the Houthis use coastal missile batteries, loitering munitions, and fast attack craft armed with light autocannons, machine guns and anti-tank missiles. Before the airstrike on the Maersk Hangzhou, the United States had shot down Houthi missiles and drones and deployed naval ships to protect Red Sea shipping lanes, but had not engaged directly with the Houthis (who act as an Iranian proxies).

The Houthi airstrikes caused Maersk, a major international shipping company, to announce on 15 December that its ships would suspend operations through the Red Sea (and then the Suez Canal) and instead would transit around the Cape of Good Hope. In response to the Houthi airstrikes, the United States government announced Operation Prosperity Guardian, a U.S. Navy-led multilateral naval operation undertaken by Combined Task Force 153 to protect shipping. With the increase in security provided by Operation Prosperity Guardian, Maersk announced on 29 December 2023, that its shipping operations would resume transiting the Red Sea. As an incentive for the crew members of ships making such transits, Maersk announced its crews passing through the Red Sea would receive double pay. The MV Maersk Hangzhou, a Danish-owned, Singapore-flagged ship, was one of the first Maersk vessels to transit the Red Sea after the company resumed operations in the area.

For increased protection, the Maersk Hangzhou had aboard a team of armed private security contractors as it transited the Red Sea. The U.S. also stationed its Carrier Strike Group 2 in the Red Sea as part of Operation Prosperity Guardian; this carrier strike group consisted of the aircraft carrier USS Dwight D. Eisenhower and its escorting Arleigh Burke-class destroyers, USS Laboon and USS Gravely. In the ten days after the launch of Operation Prosperity Guardian, naval vessels had shot down 17 drones and 4 anti-ship ballistic missiles, and approximately 1,200 merchant ships traveled through the Red Sea without any drone or missile strikes.

== Engagements ==
As the Maersk Hangzhou sailed through the Red Sea on 30 December 2023, it received airstrikes by Houthi missile batteries with at least one missile hitting the ship at approximately 8:30 P.M. local time. Responding to a distress call from the Maersk Hangzhou, the U.S. Navy destroyers USS Laboon and USS Gravely sailed to the scene, and the latter successfully intercepted two anti-ship ballistic missiles.

The next day, the Maersk Hangzhou was approached by four Houthi skiffs armed with mounted weapons. At approximately 6:30 A.M. local time (03:30 GMT), the Houthi squadron sailed within 20 meters (66 ft) of the Maersk Hangzhou, fired upon the Maersk Hangzhou using both crew-served weapons and small arms, and attempted to board the ship and seize it. The freighter's security contractors then engaged the Houthis while the freighter again issued a distress call. MH-60R helicopters from the Gravely and the aircraft carrier USS Dwight D. Eisenhower were then dispatched to the scene. On arriving they were engaged by the Houthi squadron. The American helicopters returned fire, sinking three of the Houthi craft and killing their crews. The fourth Houthi boat managed to escape. There was no damage to U.S. personnel or equipment, and no injuries to the crew of the Maersk Hangzhou.

== Aftermath ==
The U.S. Central Command said that the Houthis' assault on the Maersk Hangzhou was the 23rd "illegal attack by the Houthis on international shipping" since 19 November 2023. The Houthis acknowledged ten of its members were killed in the engagement. The Maersk Hangzhou was able to continue its journey north to Port Suez under its own power. The day after the engagement on the Maersk Hangzhou, Maersk announced that it was once again suspending its operations through the Red Sea for at least 48 hours. On 2 January, Maersk announced that it had "decided to pause all transits through the Red Sea / Gulf of Aden until further notice"; three days later, the company confirmed that "all Maersk vessels due to transit the Red Sea / Gulf of Aden will be diverted south around the Cape of Good Hope for the foreseeable future."

On 4 January, the U.S. and its allies (Australia, Bahrain, Belgium, Canada, Denmark, Germany, Italy, Japan, the Netherlands, New Zealand, Singapore, and the UK) issued a "final warning" to the Houthis in a joint statement, calling for "the immediate end of these illegal attacks and release of unlawfully detained vessels and crews" and stating "The Houthis will bear the responsibility of the consequences should they continue to threaten lives, the global economy, and free flow of commerce in the region's critical waterways." British Foreign Secretary David Cameron, in a telephone call to Iranian Foreign Minister Hossein Amir-Abdollahian, said that the UK held Iran responsible for halting airstrikes on commercial ships in the Red Sea, given Iran's "longstanding support to the Houthis"; Grant Shapps, the UK's defense minister, said that Britain would consider "direct action" against the Houthis to prevent future "unlawful seizures and attacks" in the Red Sea.

On 7 January, the Houthis demanded that all commercial ships denounce Israel or face attack; they also vowed more retaliatory attacks against the U.S. Navy.
