= Slow steaming =

Cargo ship operating practice

Slow steaming (or low steaming) is the practice of operating transoceanic cargo ships, especially container ships, at significantly less than their maximum speed. In 2010, an analyst at the National Ports and Waterways Institute stated that nearly all global shipping lines were using slow steaming to save money on fuel.

== Rationale and history ==
Slow steaming was adopted in 2007 in the face of rapidly rising fuel oil costs, which was 700 USD per tonne between July 2007 to July 2008. According to Maersk Line, who introduced the practice in 2009 to 2010, slow steaming is conducted at 18 knots (33 km/h; 21 mph). Speeds of 14 to 16 kn (26 to 30 km/h; 16 to 18 mph) were used on Asia-Europe backhaul routes in 2010. Speeds under 18 kn (33 km/h; 21 mph) are called super slow steaming. Marine engine manufacturer Wärtsilä calculates that fuel consumption can be reduced by 59% by reducing cargo ship speed from 27 knots (50 km/h; 31 mph) to 18 kn (33 km/h; 21 mph), at the cost of an additional week's sailing time on Asia-Europe routes. It adds a comparable 4 to 7 days to trans-Pacific voyages.

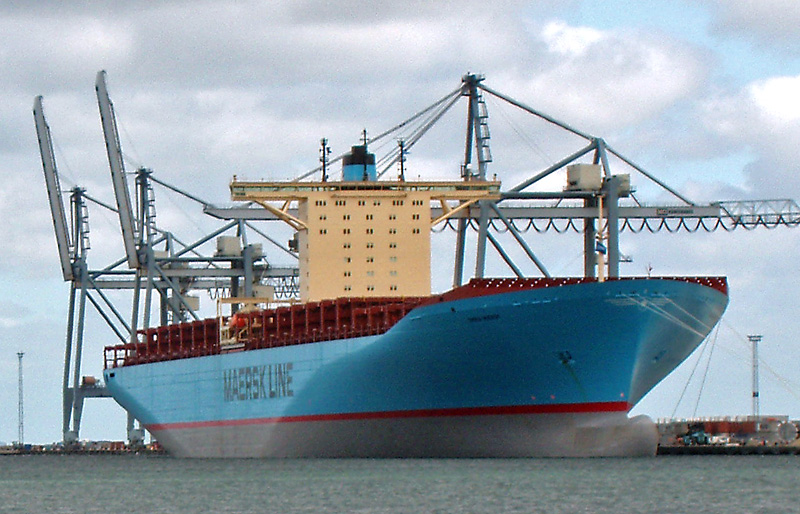
Container ship Emma Mærsk in Aarhus, 5 September 2006

Mærsk Line's E-class container ships such as the Emma Mærsk can save 4 metric kilotons of fuel oil on a Europe-Singapore voyage by slow steaming. At typical fuel prices of US$600-700 per tonne, this works out to a saving of US$2.4-2.8 million on a typical one-way voyage. Maersk's Triple E-class container ships were designed for slow steaming and have less powerful engines than their predecessors.

== Cost and benefits ==
Lowering speed reduces fuel consumption because the force of drag imparted by a fluid increases quadratically with increase in speed. Thus traveling twice as fast requires four times as much energy and therefore fuel for a given distance. The power needed to overcome drag is the product of the force times speed and thus becomes the cube of the speed at high Reynolds numbers. This is why driving an automobile at 100 km/h (60 mph) requires almost twice as much power as driving the same vehicle at 80 km/h (50 mph).

Although lowering speeds reduces the power requirements, the overall benefits of speed reduction may be limited by other factors, such as economically viable total voyage time, and the fact that a ship's engine and propeller are designed to operate within a certain RPM range. Steaming too slowly may place the engine and propeller outside their most efficient range, and will therefore begin to counteract the benefits. Also, there are time-dependent costs, such as crew wages and charter rates, that will increase if the voyage is longer. Although some ships are being put into service that are designed to steam most efficiently at slower speeds, the great cost of building a ship and need to remain competitive means that radical changes are unlikely until conditions merit such a risk. Ma Shuo, a professor of maritime economics and policy at World Maritime University (WMU) in Sweden, has undertaken research to assess the relationship between freight rates and optimal speed, confirming that as freight rates rise with market conditions, so does the economically optimal speed.

== Smart steaming ==
The tradeoff between fuel cost savings against the increased costs of personnel, insurance and inventory due to the longer voyage duration is a significant logistical issue. Commercial vessels seek to adhere reliably to schedules; if a ship is planned to slow steam, it may normally speed up should it encounter en route delays (such as bad weather or deviation) so as to recover its original scheduled arrival time. The initiative to balance cost, duration, emissions and risk is supported by the EC-funded research project SYNCHRO-NET.

Smart steaming is a strategy by which the vessel speed is dynamically optimised based on the real-time state of the sea, weather and the destination port - for example, if there is congestion at the port there is little point in rushing to get there at full speed simply to then wait for a berth for days. Instead the ship can go more slowly to conserve fuel and still berth at the same time.

The International Maritime Organization's GloMEEP project, aimed at supporting energy efficiency measures for shipping, has also studied this subject, and refers to just-in-time operation.

Smart steaming has the potential to deliver many benefits. For example the SYNCHRO-NET project has reported examples of up to 30% reduction in fuel usage for the ship, which, broadly speaking, means a similar reduction in cost and greenhouse gas emissions.

Technically and operationally, smart steaming presents several challenges. Ship control systems have to be more sophisticated, and multi-objective optimization techniques are needed which can respond to changing conditions (e.g. weather, sea state, port status). Improvements in ship/port communications are also needed, as well as new commercial and legal agreements between relevant stakeholders: ship operator, ship owner, port/terminal operator and the customer/freight forwarder whose goods are being carried by the ship.

== See also ==
- Multimodal transport
