= Hannover Bridge =

Container ship

- Container Vessel Hannover Bridge

History
- Name: Hannover Bridge
- Port of registry: Panama
- Builder: IHR-Kure, Japan
- Yard number: 3204
- Launched: 28 July 2006
- Completed: 2006
- Identification: IMO number: 9302138; MMSI number: 372104000; Callsign: 3EIC8

General characteristics
- Class & type: Container ship
- Tonnage: 98,747 gross tons
- Length: 336 m (1,102 ft)
- Beam: 46 m (151 ft)
- Installed power: diesel engine

Hannover Bridge is a container ship registered in Panama but has a Japanese ship-owner and German name.

The ship carries containers, which is the fastest-developing sector in cargo shipping. Hannover Bridge was built in 2006 in the ship-yard of IHI Marine United in Kure, Hiroshima, Japan. The ship can carry 8,212 TEUs, according to company requirements, but IMO claims that the vessel's capacity is larger than ten thousand. The operator of Hannover Bridge is the container shipping sector of K Line Group, which maintains a fleet of 55 container ships. The gross tonnage of Hannover Bridge is 98,747, the ship's length is 336 metres, and its beam is 46 metres.

The vessel's main diesel engine is a Daewoo and allows to the ship to reach a maximum speed of 24 knots. The cruising speed of Hannover Bridge is 21 knots and the economy speed is 20.5 knots. All these speeds are reached with more than 20% lower consumption of heavy fuel. The emissions of CO_{2} are decreased in the new innovated diesel engine, which is less harmful to the environment.
