= Maersk M-class container ship =

Container ship class

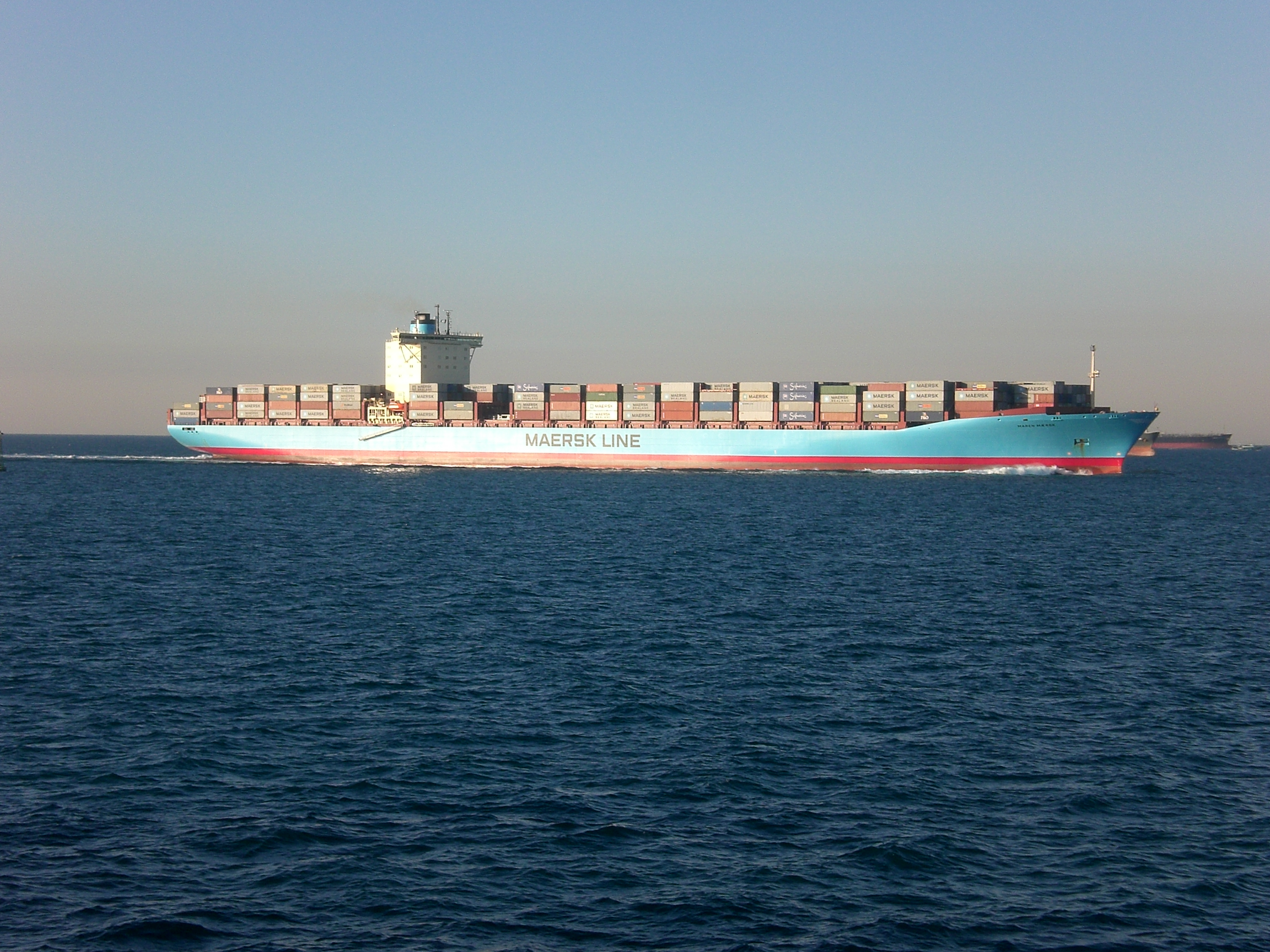

Class overview
- Builders: Odense Steel Shipyard
- Operators: Maersk Line
- In service: 2008–present
- Planned: 6
- Completed: 6
- Active: 6

General characteristics
- Type: Container ship
- Tonnage: 99,002 GT
- Length: 366.9 m (1,204 ft)
- Beam: 42.8 m (140 ft)
- Capacity: 11,008 TEU

The M class is a series of 6 container ships built for Maersk Line. The ships were built by Odense Steel Shipyard in Denmark and have a maximum theoretical capacity of around 11,008 twenty-foot equivalent units (TEU).

== List of ships ==
Ship	Previous names	Yard number	IMO number	Delivery	Status	ref
Gerner Maersk	Margrethe Maersk (2008-2014)	L211	9359002	28 Mar 2008	In service	
Gunde Maersk	Marchen Maersk (2008-2014)	L212	9359014	18 May 2008	In service	
Gunhilde Maersk	Maren Maersk (2008-2014)	L213	9359026	22 Jul 2008	In service	
Gustav Maersk	Mette Maersk (2008-2014)	L214	9359038	14 Oct 2008	In service	
Guthorm Maersk	Marit Maersk (2009-2014)	L215	9359040	19 Jan 2009	In service	
Gerda Maersk	Mathilde Maersk (2009-2014)	L216	9359052	17 Mar 2009	In service	

== See also ==
- Maersk Triple E-class container ship
- Maersk E-class container ship
- Maersk H-class container ship
- Maersk Edinburgh-class container ship
- Gudrun Maersk-class container ship
