= Gudrun Maersk-class container ship =

Container ship class

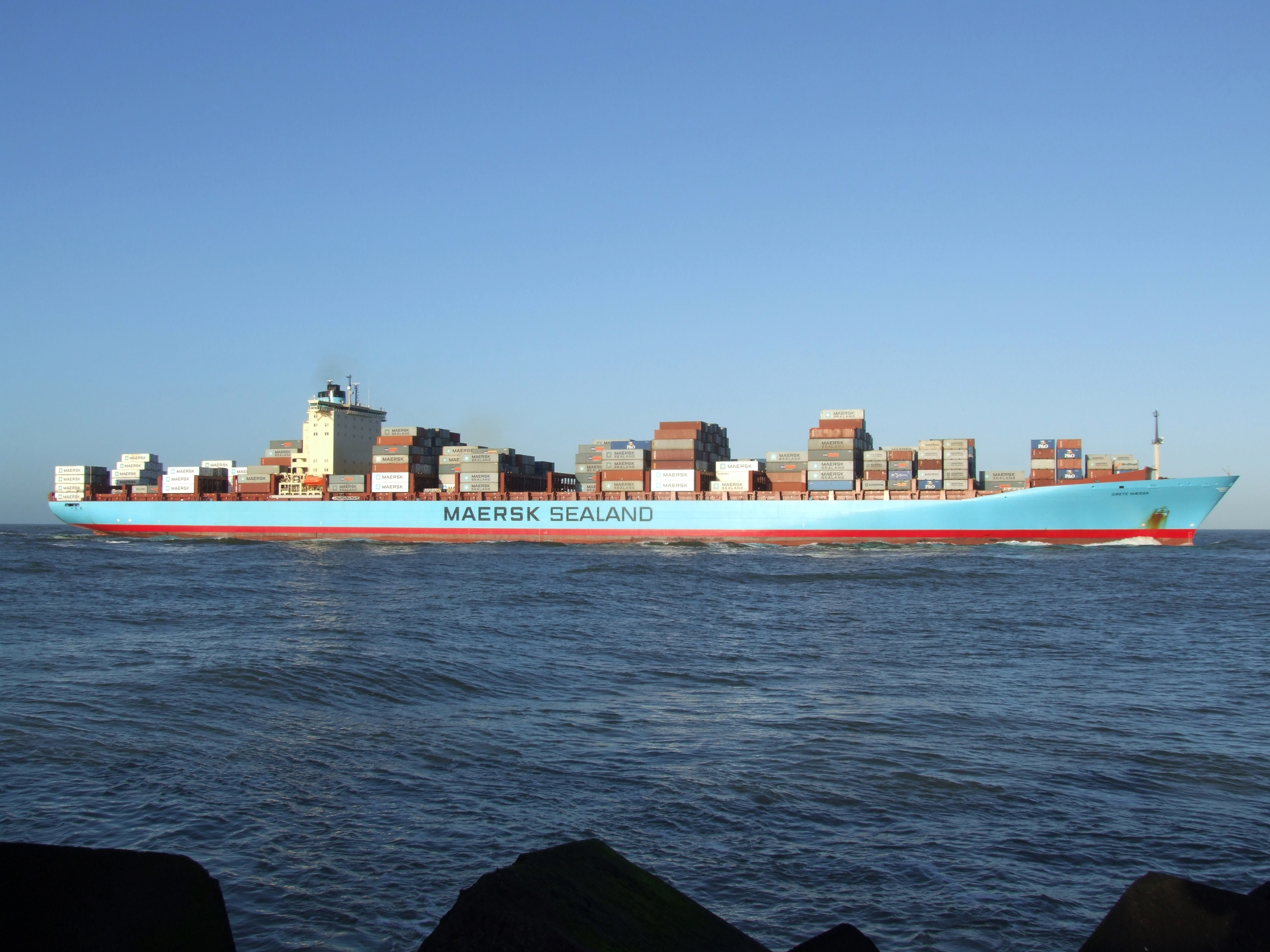
- Grete Maersk entering the Port of Rotterdam

Class overview
- Builders: Odense Steel Shipyard
- Operators: Maersk Line
- In service: 2005–present
- Planned: 6
- Completed: 6
- Active: 6

General characteristics
- Type: Container ship
- Tonnage: 98,648 GT
- Length: 366.9 m (1,204 ft)
- Beam: 42.8 m (140 ft)
- Capacity: 11,078 TEU

The Gudrun class is a series of 6 container ships built for Maersk Line. The ships were built by Odense Steel Shipyard in Denmark and have a maximum theoretical capacity of around 11,078 twenty-foot equivalent units (TEU).

== List of ships ==
Ship	Yard number	IMO number	Delivery	Status	ref
Gudrun Maersk	L197	9302877	9 Jun 2005	In service	
Grete Maersk	L198	9302889	15 Aug 2005	In service	
Gunvor Maersk	L199	9302891	20 Oct 2005	In service	
Gjertrud Maersk	L200	9320233	15 Dec 2005	In service	
Gerd Maersk	L201	9320245	16 Feb 2006	In service	
Georg Maersk	L202	9320257	12 Apr 2006	In service	

== See also ==
- Maersk Triple E-class container ship
- Maersk E-class container ship
- Maersk H-class container ship
- Maersk Edinburgh-class container ship
- Maersk M-class container ship
