= Maersk Line =

Danish shipping company

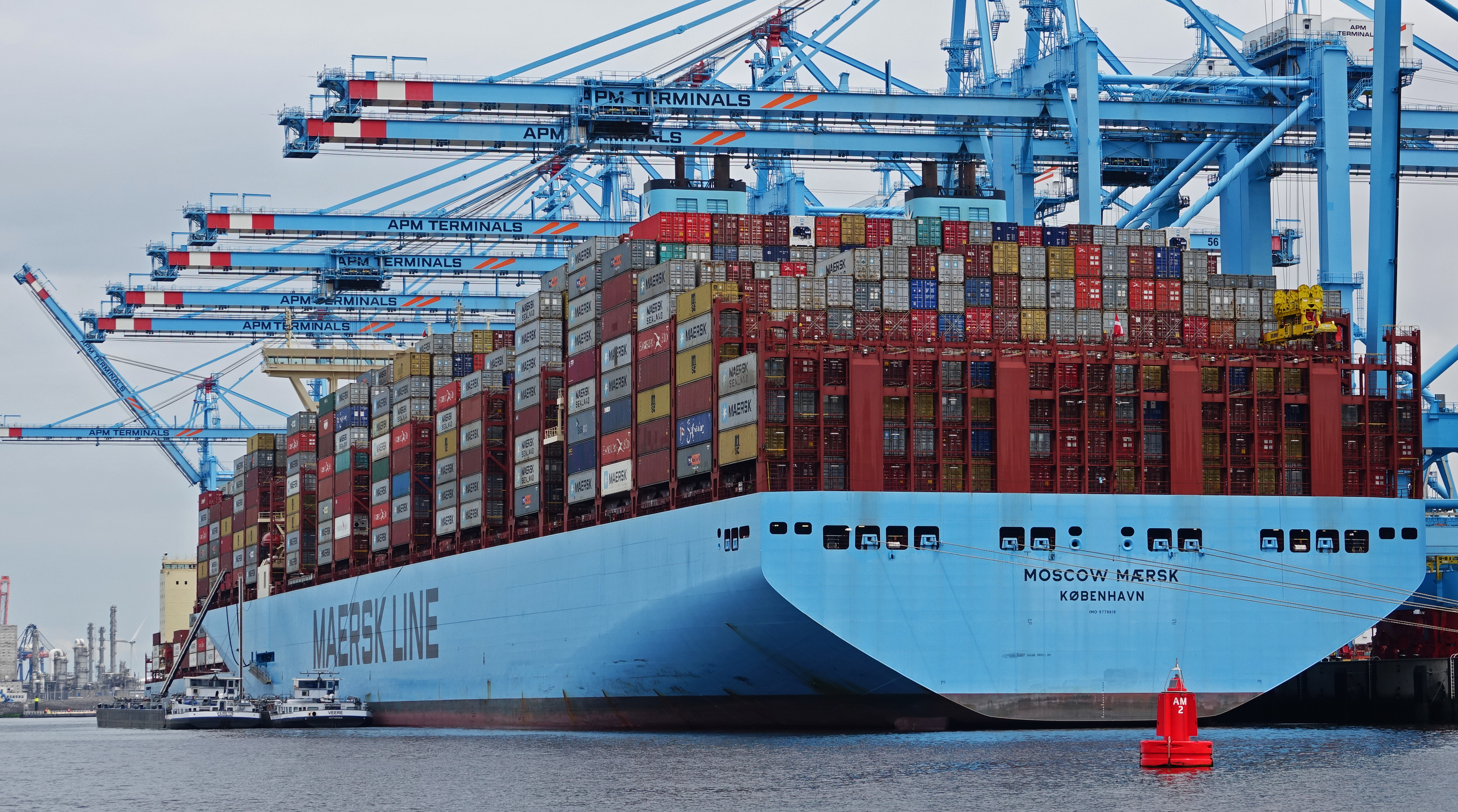
- Type: Subsidiary
- Industry: Container shipping
- Founded: 1928; 98 years ago
- Headquarters: Copenhagen, Denmark
- Area served: Worldwide
- Key people: Vincent Clerc (CEO)
- Revenue: ▲US$81.529 billion (2022)
- Owner: Maersk
- Number of employees: 110,000+ (as of 2022 end; worldwide)
- Website: maersk.com

Maersk Line is a Danish international container shipping company and the largest operating subsidiary of Maersk, a Danish business conglomerate. Founded in 1928, it is the world's second largest container shipping company by both fleet size and cargo capacity, offering regular services to 374 ports in 116 countries. As of 2024, it employed over 100,000 people. Maersk Line operates over 700 vessels and has a total capacity of about 4.1 million TEU.

== History ==
At the beginning of the 1920s, A.P. Møller considered possibilities of going into liner trade business. The tramp trade, where vessels sailed from port to port depending on the demand, was expected to lose ground to liners in time. On 12 July 1928, the vessel Leise Mærsk left Baltimore on its first voyage from the American East Coast via the Panama Canal to the Far East and back. The cargo consisted of Ford car parts and other general cargo. This heralded the start of Maersk's shipping services. Maersk Line began to grow in 1946 after the Second World War by transporting goods between America and Europe before expanding services in 1950. On 26 April 1956, ocean-borne container transport was introduced with the shipment of a SeaLand container aboard the SS Ideal X from Port Newark, New Jersey, to Houston, Texas. In 1967, British carrier P&O was part of the first European initiative, a pooling of liner services from four companies, into the new company Overseas Containers Limited (OCL). Both Sea-land and P&O would later be taken over by Maersk Line as it expanded operations between 1999 and 2005.

In 1999, Maersk entered into an agreement on acquisition of Safmarine Container Lines (SCL) and its related liner activities from South African Marine Corporation Limited (Safmarine). At the time of acquisition, Safmarine Container Lines operated approximately 50 liner vessels and a fleet of about 80,000 containers. It covered a total of ten trades and fully complemented Maersk Line's existing network. Safmarine Container Lines joined the A.P. Moller – Maersk Group as an independent unit with its own liner activities.

On 10 December 1999, the A.P. Moller Group acquired the international container business of SeaLand Service Inc. The business was integrated with the A.P. Moller Group companies and as part of the integration, Maersk Line changed its name to Maersk Sealand. The acquisition comprised 70 vessels, almost 200,000 containers as well as terminals, offices and agencies around the world.

In May 2005 Maersk announced plans to purchase P&O Nedlloyd for 2.3 billion euros. At the time of the acquisition, P&O Nedlloyd had 6% of the global industry market share, and Maersk-Sealand had 12%. The combined company would be about 18% of world market share. Maersk completed the buyout of the company on 13 August 2005, Royal P&O Nedlloyd shares terminated trading on 5 September. In February 2006, the new combined entity adopted the name Maersk Line.

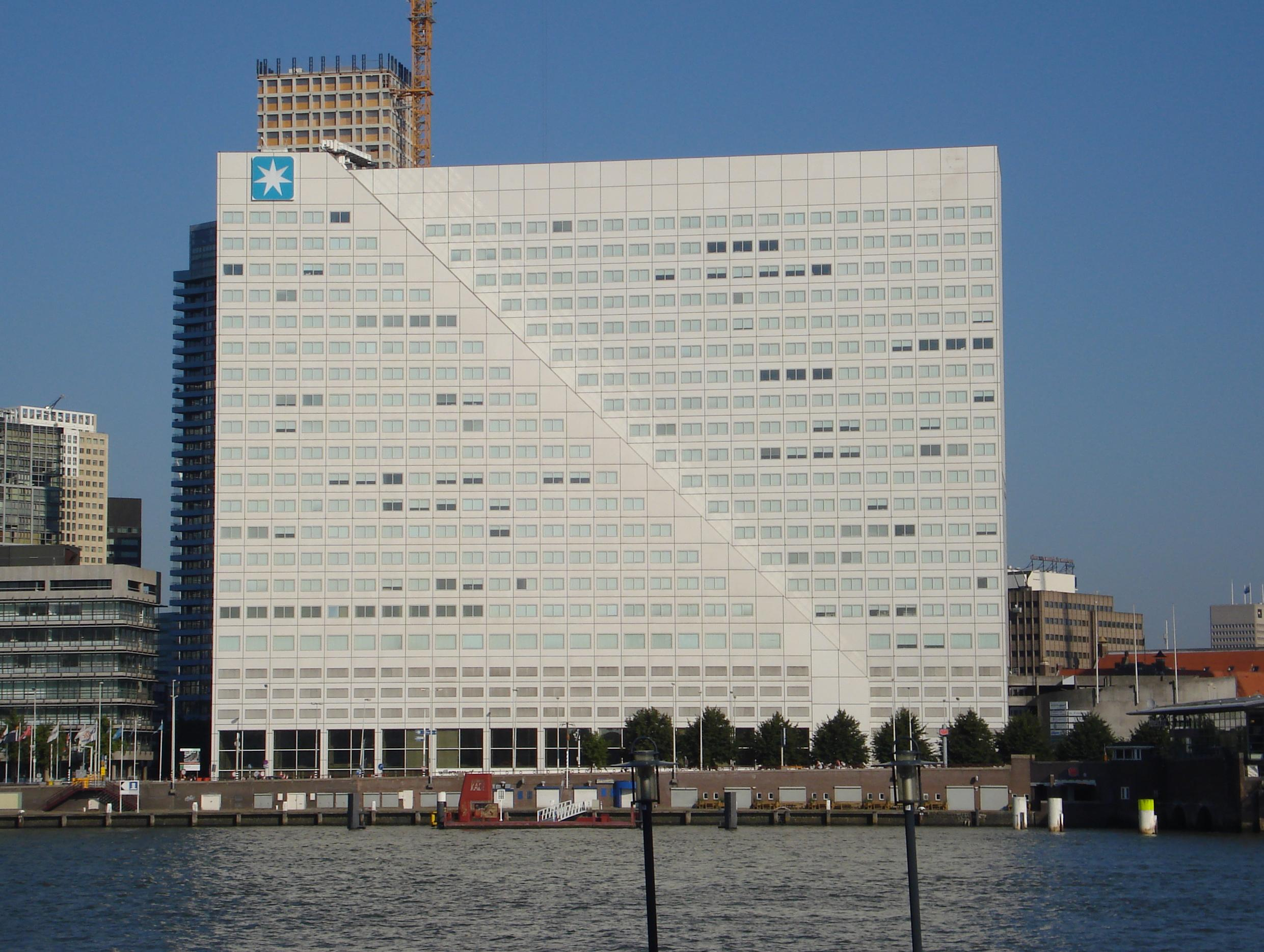
The Willemswerf building, the former Nedlloyd and P&O Nedlloyd corporate headquarters in Rotterdam. Currently the home of Maersk Line's European operations.

At the time the company was folded into A.P. Moller, it owned and chartered a fleet of over 160 vessels. Its container fleet, consisting of owned and leased vessels, had a capacity of 635,000 twenty-foot equivalent units (TEU). Royal P&O Nedlloyd N.V. had 13,000 employees in 146 countries.

By the end of 2006, Maersk global market share had fallen from 18.2% to 16.8%, at the same time, the next two largest carriers increased their market share, Mediterranean Shipping Company went from 8.6% to 9.5% and CMA CGM from 5.6% to 6.5%. In January 2008, Maersk Line announced drastic reorganisational measures.

In November 2015, after lower than expected results, Maersk Line announced its decision to lay off 4000 employees by 2017. The group said it would cut its annual administration costs by $250 million over the next two years and would cancel 35 scheduled voyages in the fourth quarter of 2015 on top of four regularly scheduled sailings it canceled earlier in the year.

As of October 2015, Maersk Line along with its subsidiaries such as Seago, MCC, Safmarine and SeaLand, control a combined 18% share of the total container shipping market.

Since 1 December 2017, Hamburg Süd had been part of the company. In 2023, it was announced that Hamburg Süd would be unified with the Maersk brand.

In March 2021, Maersk announced that is aiming to have the world's first carbon neutral vessel launched in 2023, seven years ahead of its original schedule. In August of that year, the company purchased eight methanol powered shipping vessels for $1.4 billion from Hyundai Heavy Industries.

In 2012, Maersk Line paid $31.9 million in fines to the U.S. following a Department of Justice investigation contending that Maersk had "knowingly overcharged the Department of Defense to transport thousands of containers from ports to inland delivery destinations in Iraq and Afghanistan" while under government contract to transport cargo via container ships in support of U.S. troops.

The Red Sea crisis has had a significant impact on shipping, from November 2023 onward; in May 2024, Maersk estimated the impact as a capacity loss of 15–20 percent across the merchant shipping industry, based on its FY second quarter. Maersk also announced that its ships were rerouting around the Cape of Good Hope to avoid further attacks.

== 2M Alliance: Maersk/MSC ==
In 2015, Maersk and Mediterranean Shipping Company (MSC) launched the 2M Alliance, a vessel-sharing agreement on the Asia-Europe, trans-Pacific and trans-Atlantic trades. The arrangement, which includes a series of slot exchanges and slot purchases on east–west routes, also involves Maersk Line and MSC taking over a number of charters and operations of vessels chartered to HMM. The 2M Alliance include 185 vessels with an estimated capacity of 2.1 million TEU, deployed on 21 strings. On 25 January 2023, CEO Vincent Clerc of A. P. Moller – Maersk and CEO Soren Toft of MSC announced in a joint press statement that the two shipping lines would terminate the 2M Alliance in January 2025.

== Sustainability ==
In 2011–12, Maersk Line cooperated with the US Navy on testing between 7 and 100% algae biofuel on Maersk Kalmar. From 2007 to 2014, and mainly due to slow steaming, Maersk Line reduced its CO_{2} emissions by 40% or 11 million tonnes, about the same reduction as the rest of Denmark.

Maersk set a goal in December 2018 to be carbon neutral by 2050. In 2017, the company's ships emitted 35.5 million tonnes of CO2e, and it hopes to eliminate that by using biofuels to power its fleet. In 2022, Maersk ordered 12 dual-fuel container ships from Hyundai by 2025, capable of sailing on both fossil bunker fuel and methanol.

== Services ==
Maersk's main operations serve the Asia-Europe and Trans-Atlantic trades, and also between South America and Europe as well as to Africa. The company also introduced the concept of Daily Maersk in 2011, which provided a premium guaranteed service between supply ports of China and European base ports. Despite support from the trade, Maersk Line was forced to cut down services due to oversupply. Recent restructuring of its products have included upgrades to their Asia to Australia, India to West Africa, and China to America routes.

In addition to those main trade routes, Maersk Line also operates many continental trade lines. It operates in its Intra-Asia route through MCC Transport, its European route through Seago Lines, and recently re-launched the SeaLand Service brand for its American trade lanes.

== Fleet ==
As of 2024, the Maersk Line fleet comprises more than 700 vessels (with Hamburg Süd and Safmarine combined) and a multitude of containers corresponding to more than 3.8 million TEU (twenty-foot equivalent unit)

In 2006, the E-class vessel Emma Maersk, was delivered to Maersk Line from Odense Steel Shipyard. It was by far, the largest container ship in the world at the time.

Seven other sister ships have since been built, and in 2011, Maersk ordered 20 even larger container ships from Daewoo, the Triple E class, each with a capacity of 18,000 containers. The first of these Triple E Class ships was delivered on 14 June 2013, and was christened with the name Mærsk Mc-Kinney Møller after the son of the founder of the Maersk Line.

The following list is not complete, due to smaller feeder ships, that not are included as part of the Maersk Line fleet:

Container ship classes of Maersk Line
Ship class	Built	Capacity (TEU)	Ships in class	Notes
S-class	1997–2000	8,160	3 out of 11	1 ship is scrapped and 7 ships under new owner.
C-class	1999–2002	8,650	5 out of 8	5 ships upgrated to 9,640 TEU, 3 under new owner
L-class III	2001	3,700	6	Laura Maersk renamed to Louis Maersk
Gudrun-class	2004–2006	11,078	6	
B-class	2006–2007	4,200	7	4 ships under new owner(MSC).
E-class	2006–2008	14,770	8	
M-class II	2007–2009	11,008	6	
Edinburgh-class	2010–2011	13,092	13	Long-term charter from Rickmers
Triple E-class Gen.1	2013–2015	18,270	20	Mærsk Mc-Kinney Møller was the world’s largest container ship when was delivered in July 2013.
Triple E-class Gen.2	2017–2019	20,568	11	Madrid Maersk was the world’s largest container ship when was delivered in April 2017.
H-class	2017–2019	15,226	11	
V-class	2018–2019	3,600	7	
Laura Mærsk	2023	2,100	1	First ship in fleet to run on methanol.
A-Class III	2024-2025	16,000	12	First class to run on methanol.
B-Class II	2025-2026	17,000	6	Built by Hyundai Heavy Industries.
T-Class	2026–27; 2028–30	9,000	6+2	Built by Yangzijiang Shipbuilding.
TBD	2026	8,000	8	To be built by Yangzijiang Shipbuilding.
TBD	2027-2028	16,000	32	10 to be built by Hanwha Ocean; 10 to be built by Yangzijiang Shipbuilding; 12 to be built by New Times Shipbuilding
TBD	2027–29; 2028–30	17,000	10+6	To be built by Yangzijiang Shipbuilding.
TBD	2028–2029	18,000	8	To be built from New Times Shipbuilding.
TBD	2028–2030	15,000	12	6 to be built from Hanwha Ocean; 6 to be built from New Times Shipbuilding.

Former container ship classes of Maersk Line
Ship class	Built	Capacity (TEU)	Ships in class	Notes
A-class I	1974–1976	1,984	9	All 9 scrapped between 1999-2015
L-class I	1980–1983	3,000	6+1	3 ships rebuilt by the United States Navy, and 4 ships were scrapped
L-class II	1983–1985	3,300	4	All 4 ships are scrapped
M-class I	1988–1991	4,300	12	11 are scrapped, 1 is now owned by MSC
K-class	1995–1997	6,418	6	2 ships are scrapped, and 4 ships under new owner.
A-class II	2002–2004	8,272	6	All 6 ship sold to new owners

== Accidents and incidents ==
=== Maersk Alabama ===
On 8 April 2009, the container ship Maersk Alabama was seized by pirates in the Indian Ocean at a distance of 240 nautical miles (440 km; 280 mi) southeast of Eyl, Somalia. The siege ended after a rescue effort by the United States Navy on 12 April.

=== Emma Maersk ===
On 1 February 2013, the container ship Emma Maersk suffered a damaged stern thruster and took on so much water in the Suez Canal that she became unmaneuverable. Tugs, anchors and the wind took her to Port Said to offload 13,500 containers, drain her and be investigated by divers. She had not been in danger of sinking.

On 15 February 2013, the Maersk Line confirmed that she was about to leave Port Said under tow to a yard for further assessment and repair. On 25 February she reached the yard of Palermo, Sicily, where she was scheduled to stay for four months. The flooded engine was disassembled, repaired and assembled, and in August 2013, she was in service again after a DKK 250 million (roughly US$44.5m) repair.

=== Maersk Honam ===
On 6 March 2018, a major fire broke out in the No.3 forward cargo hold of Maersk Honam while the vessel was in the Arabian Sea about 900 nautical miles (1,700 km; 1,000 mi) southeast of Salalah, Oman, en route from Singapore to Suez. It took over three days to get the fire under control and the ship continued to burn for several more weeks. The ship was salvaged and the damaged parts of the vessel were rebuilt. Retaining its original IMO number, the ship was renamed Maersk Halifax before entering into service again in August 2019.

=== Maersk Roubaix ===
On 21 December 2021, the container ship Maersk Roubaix suffered from engine issues and became adrift in the Mediterranean Sea 370 kilometres (230 mi) from Malta, while it was en route to the port of Algeciras in Spain. A tugboat was dispatched to assist.

=== Mumbai Maersk ===
On 2 February 2022, the container ship Mumbai Maersk ran aground near the Port of Bremerhaven in Germany. A first attempt to tow the container ship into deeper water using two multi-purpose vessels and five tugboats failed. On 4 February, the ship was refloated with the help of eight tugboats. A vessel assessment was done when she arrived at the Port of Bremerhaven.

=== Maersk Hangzhou ===
On 31 December 2023, Houthis attacked Maersk Hangzhou from smaller ships, while traversing the Red Sea. Shots were fired at the vessel and boarding attempts were made while a private security team aboard defended the container ship. The aircraft carrier USS Dwight D. Eisenhower and its helicopters, along with destroyer USS Gravely, responded to Maersk Hangzhou's distress call. The U.S. ships, part of Operation Prosperity Guardian, sunk three of the four Houthi militant ships, killing 10 aboard.

=== Maersk Sentosa ===
On 9 July 2024, the Houthis attacked the American-flagged Maersk Sentosa in the Gulf of Aden.

=== Maersk Frankfurt ===
On 22 July 2024, one person died in a severe blaze onboard Maersk Frankfurt, off Goa in the Indian coast.

=== Maersk Shekou ===
On 30 August 2024, the Singaporean-flagged container ship, Maersk Shekou collided with the Australian sail training ship Leeuwin II in Fremantle Harbour. Two men were injured and Leeuwin II suffered "catastrophic damage".

== See also ==
- A.P. Moller – Maersk Group
- List of largest container ships
