= H-class container ship =

Class of container ships

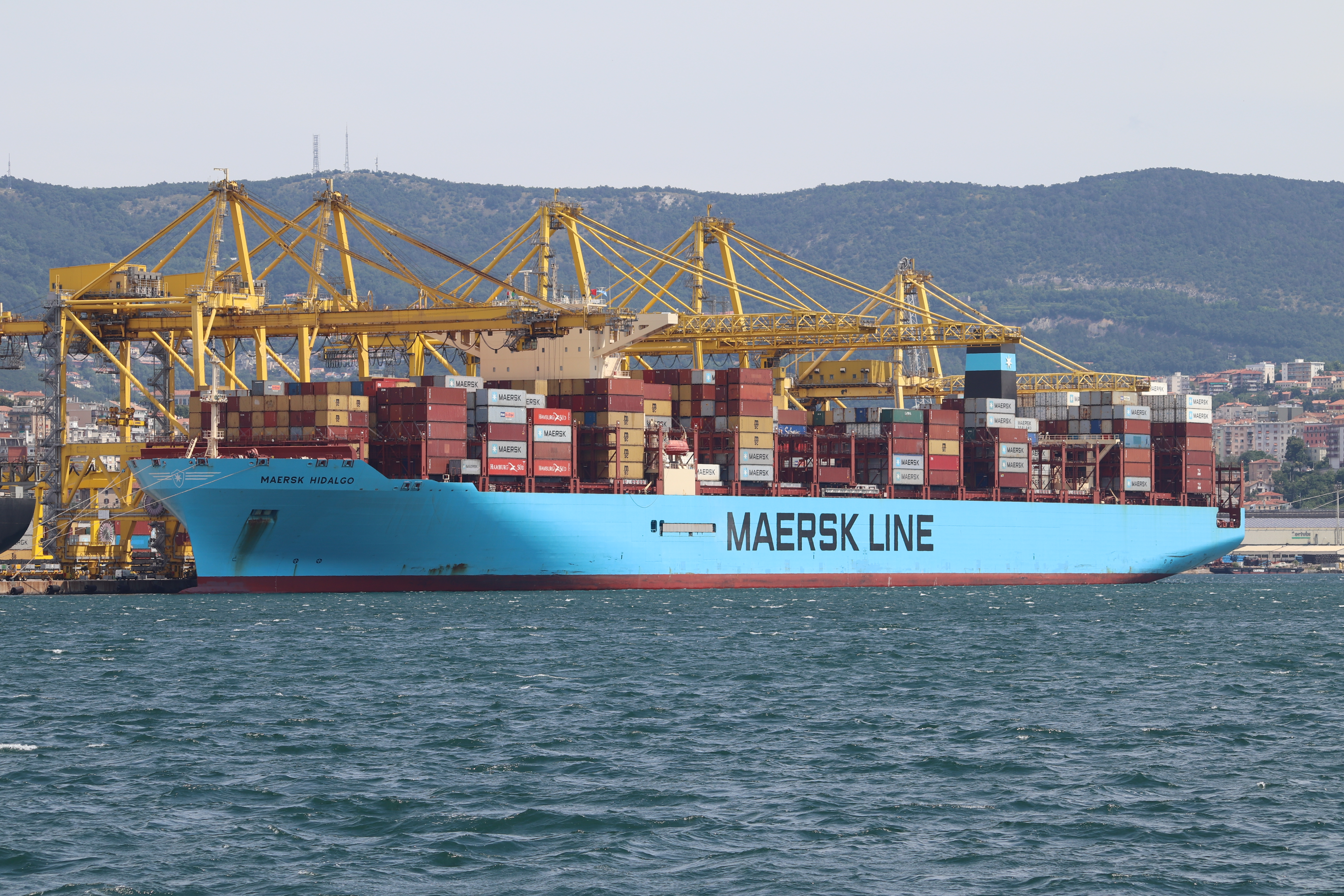
- Maersk Hidalgo in the port of Trieste

Class overview
- Builders: Hyundai Heavy Industries, Ulsan, South Korea
- Operators: Maersk Line
- Preceded by: Triple E-class container ship
- In service: 2017–present
- Planned: 11
- Completed: 11
- Active: 11

General characteristics
- Type: Container ship
- Tonnage: 153,774 GT
- Length: 353 m (1,158 ft 2 in)
- Beam: 53.5 m (175 ft 6 in)
- Draft: 15 m (49 ft 3 in)=
- Depth: 29.9 m (98 ft 1 in)
- Capacity: 15,226 TEU

The H class is a class of container ships operated by the Danish shipping company Maersk Line. The ships were built by Hyundai Heavy Industries at their shipyard located in Ulsan, South Korea.

The ships are each 353 metres (1,158 ft 2 in) long and 53.5 metres (175 ft 6 in) wide. The ship has 21 container bays and can carry a maximum of 21 TEU containers wide on deck. They are not designed with a specific speed and draft in mind and thus can be deployed on both east-west and north-south maritime routes.

The first nine ships were ordered by Maersk in 2015. In 2018 Maersk announced it had ordered two additional ships from the same shipbuilder.

== Service history ==
=== 2018 Maersk Honam fire ===
On 6 March 2018, a large fire broke out in one of the cargo holds of the Maersk Honam. It took more than three days to get the fire under control and the ship continued to burn for several more days. Four crew members died and one more was reported missing. The ship was salvaged and the damaged parts of the vessel were rebuilt. The ship was renamed Maersk Halifax before entering into service again.

=== Attack on Maersk Hangzhou ===
On 30 December 2023 Maersk Hangzhou was attacked in the Gulf of Aden by Houthi forces, attempting to board the vessel. Personnel aboard the ship repelled the attack and with the aid of the United States Navy, drove off the attackers.

== List of ships ==
| Ship name | Yard number | IMO number | Delivered | Status | Ref. |
|---|---|---|---|---|---|
| Maersk Hong Kong | 2871 | 9784257 | 6 July 2017 | In service | |
| Maersk Horsburgh | 2872 | 9784269 | 11 August 2017 | In service | |
| Maersk Honam now Maersk Halifax | 2873 | 9784271 | 31 August 2017 | In service | |
| Maersk Hidalgo | 2874 | 9784283 | 16 October 2017 | In service | |
| Maersk Hanoi | 2875 | 9784295 | 6 January 2018 | In service | |
| Maersk Hangzhou | 2876 | 9784300 | 5 February 2018 | In service | |
| Maersk Hamburg | 2877 | 9784312 | 1 May 2018 | In service | |
| Maersk Herrera | 2878 | 9784324 | 31 July 2018 | In service | |
| Maersk Havana | 2879 | 9784336 | 4 January 2019 | In service | |
| Maersk Huacho | 3040 | 9848948 | 15 April 2019 | In service | |
| Maersk Houston | 3041 | 9848950 | 15 May 2019 | In service | |
