= Maersk Edinburgh-class container ship =

Class of post-Panamax container ships

Maersk Edinburgh class
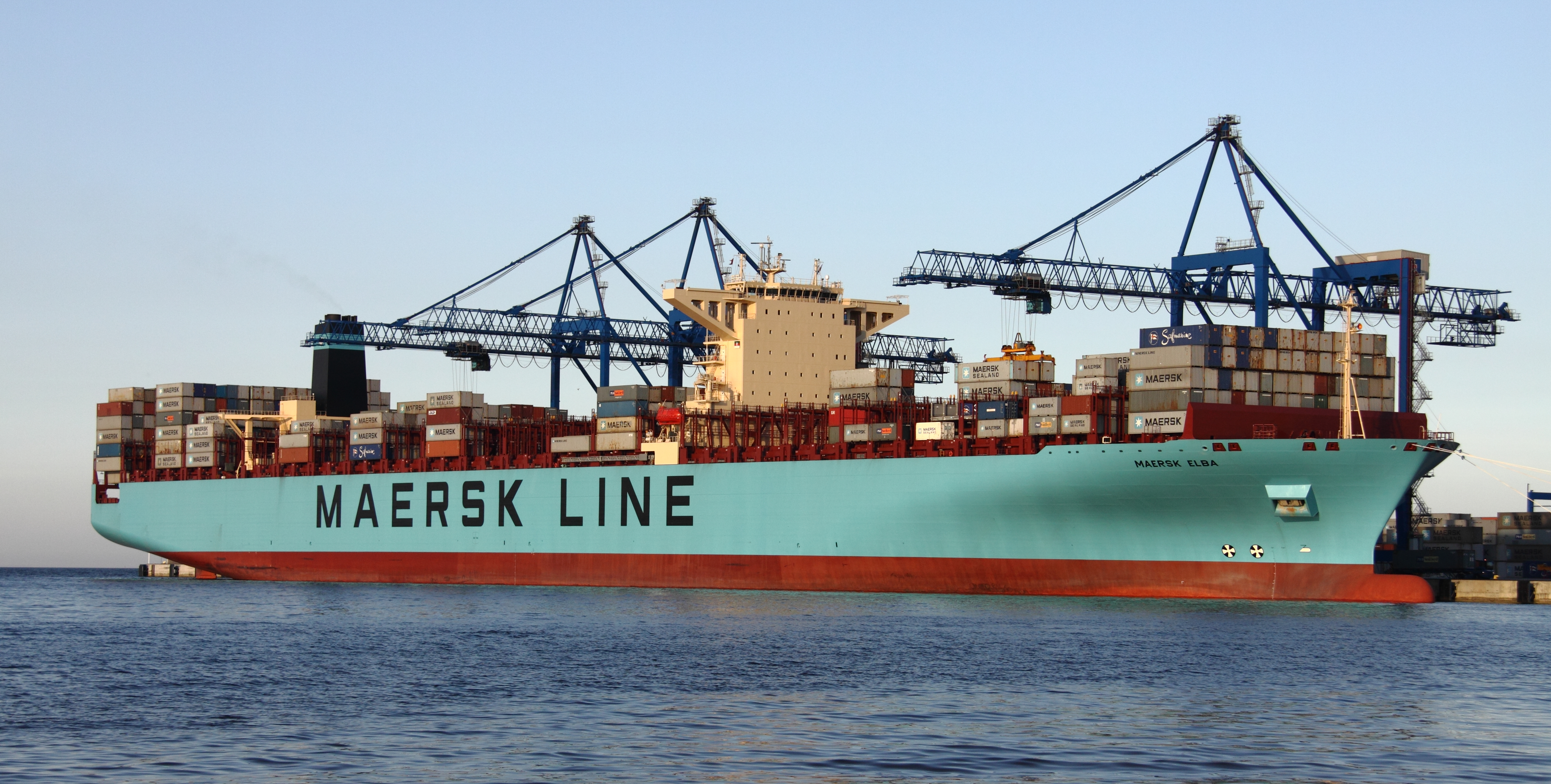
- Container ship Maersk Elba at Gdańsk Deepwater Container Terminal in 2011

Class overview
- Builders: Hyundai Heavy Industries, Hyundai Samho Heavy Industries
- Operators: Maersk Line, Mediterranean Shipping Company, CMA CGM
- In service: 2010–present
- Planned: 13
- Completed: 13
- Active: 13

General characteristics
- Type: Container ship
- Tonnage: 140,580 DWT (max); 59,800 NT
- Length: 366 m (1,200 ft 9 in)
- Beam: 48.2 m (158 ft 2 in)
- Draft: 14.50–15.50 m (47 ft 7 in – 50 ft 10 in)
- Propulsion: Hyundai-Wärtsilä 12RT-flex 96C two-stroke diesel engines (68,640 kW (92,050 hp)); Bow thrusters (2 x 1,800 kW (2,400 hp))
- Speed: 24.3 knots (45.0 km/h; 28.0 mph)
- Capacity: 13,092 TEU; 800 TEU (reefers)

The Edinburgh class (also known as the Pearl class) is a series of post-Panamax container built for Rickmers Group and Zodiac Maritime and were chartered to Maersk The ships were built by Hyundai Heavy Industries.

== History ==
The series was ordered from Hyundai Heavy Industries in 2007 to 2008 and delivered starting July 2010. The client of the series is the Hamburg-based Rickmers Group and were chartered to Maersk. The Explorer class and Daniela class are also based on the same design, but both broader.

The Maersk Edinburgh class, along with the Explorer class were designed for a slow steaming container service from Europe to East Asia. The beginning of the service with the abbreviations FAL 5 and AE8 was already planned for the summer of 2009, but was not realised due to the 2008 financial crisis. It will run through the ports of Le Havre, Hamburg, Rotterdam, Zeebrugge, Port Kelang, Singapore, Ningbo, Shanghai, Shenzhen-Yantian, Tanjung Pelepas, Port Kelang, and back to Le Havre. As of 2010, the ships of the Maersk Edinburgh class were introduced to the FAL5 / AE8 Far East Europe service.

=== Records ===
The Maersk Elba visited Gdansk on May 11, 2011, becoming the largest container vessel ever handled by a Baltic Sea port, and then visited Port of Haifa in 2017 to set a record for the largest ship to dock in Israel.

== Ships ==
Ship	Previous names	Yard number	IMO number	In service date	Operator	Ref
Ships built for Rickmers
Maersk Edinburgh	Pearl Rickmers (2010)	2150	9456757	5 Jul 2010	Maersk Line	
Maersk Emden	Ruby Rickmers (2010)	2151	9456769	9 Jul 2010	Maersk Line	
Maersk Eindhoven	Aqua Rickmers (2010)	2152	9456771	16 Aug 2010	Maersk Line	
Maersk Essen	Coconee Rickmers (2010)	2153	9456783	31 Aug 2010	Maersk Line	
Maersk Edmonton	Leo Rickmers (2011)	2170	9458030	18 Feb 2011	Maersk Line	
Maersk Elba	Scorpio Rickmers*	2171	9458078	10 Mar 2011	Maersk Line	
Maersk Evora	Tauro Rickmers*	2172	9458080	1 Jun 2011	Maersk Line	
Maersk Essex	Libra Rickmers*	2173	9458092	22 Jul 2011	Maersk Line	
Ships built for Zodiac Maritime
Edison	Maersk Edison (2011–2017)	S433	9463011	12 Jan 2011	CMA CGM	
Erving	Maersk Erving (2011–2017)	S434	9463023	2 Mar 2011	CMA CGM	
MSC Natasha	Maersk Eubank (2011–2018)	S435	9463035	30 Mar 2011	MSC	
MSC Emma	Maersk Enfield (2011–2012); CMA CGM Enfield (2012–2013); Maersk Enfield (2013–2018)	S436	9463047	4 May 2011	MSC	
MSC Elisa	Maersk Effingham (2011–2012); CMA CGM Effingham (2012–2013); Maersk Effingham (2013–2018)	S437	9463059	15 Jun 2011	MSC	
* = Shipping company's internal name only

== See also ==
- Maersk Triple E-class container ship
