= History of Maersk =

History of a Danish business conglomerate

The A. P. Moller-Maersk Group (Danish: A.P. Møller-Mærsk Gruppen) is an international business conglomerate more commonly known simply as Maersk. This article concerns the history of the company.

The beginning of the A.P. Møller-Mærsk Group was the shipping company Dampskibsselskabet Svendborg, founded by captain Peter Mærsk-Møller and his son Arnold Peter Møller (2 October 1876 – June 1965) in Svendborg, 1904. A.P. Møller had four children, one of whom was Mærsk Mc-Kinney Møller. In 1940, he became a partner of the company. After the death of A.P. Møller in June 1965, Mc-Kinney Møller became CEO of the company and had this post until 1993, when he was succeeded by Jess Søderberg. Beginning in 1965, Mærsk Mc-Kinney Møller also served as company chairman and did not relinquish this position until December 2003 (when he was 90 years old). He was still one of the "managing owners" of the company at the time of his death and was chairman of Odense Steel Shipyard until 2 May 2006.

== 1886–1945: Beginnings to World War II ==
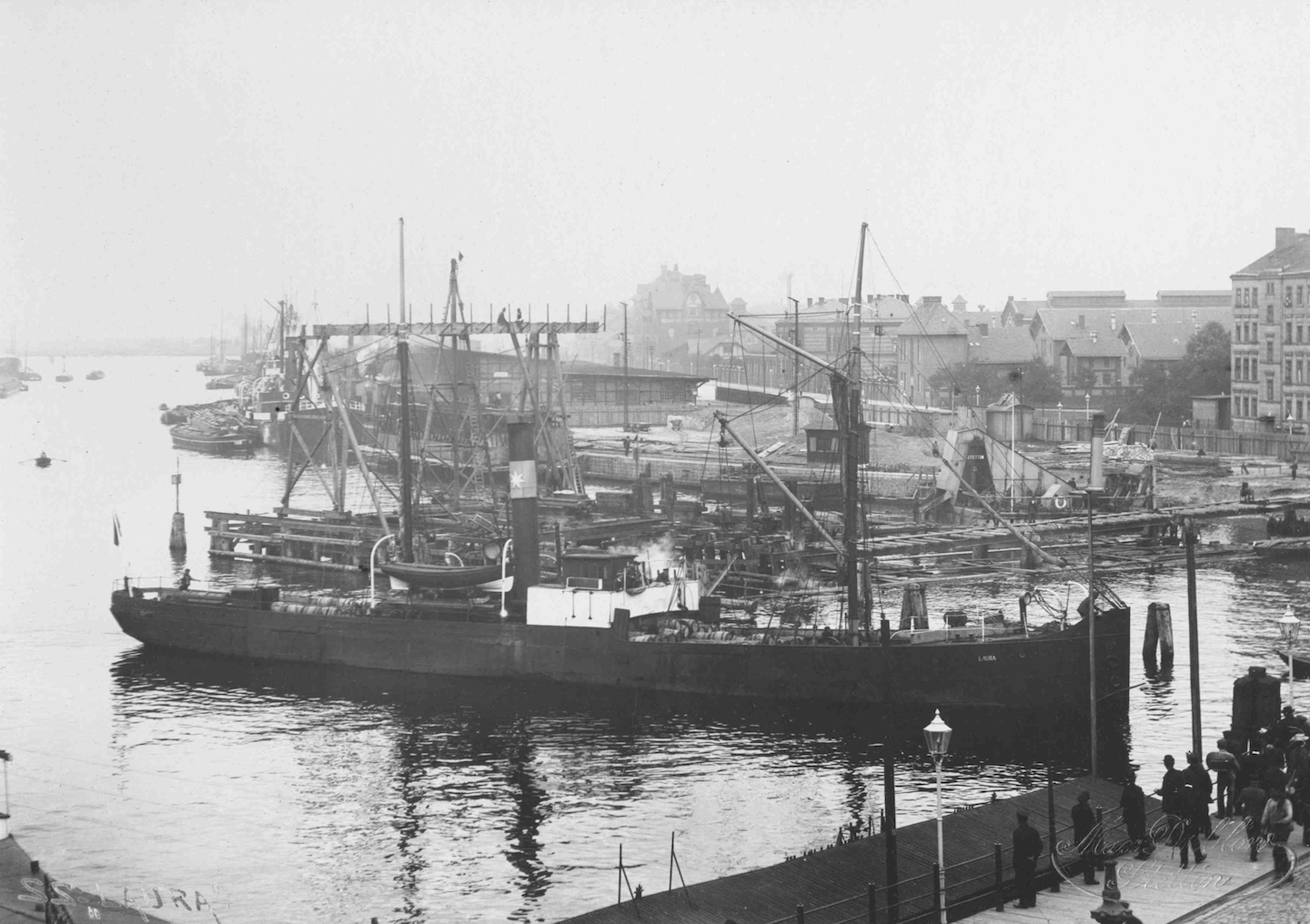
SS Laura in 1886

- 1886: Captain Peter Mærsk-Møller buys his first steamship, the British-built SS Laura.
- 1904: The Steamship Company Svendborg is founded by Captain Peter Mærsk-Møller and Arnold Peter Møller. The company's first ship was the British-built 2,200 tdw cargo steamer Svendborg.
- 1912: Steamship Company of 1912 is founded by A.P. Møller.
- 1918-1919: A.P. Møller builds his own shipyard, the Odense Staalskibsvaerft near the Odense Canal in the city of Odense. Keels are laid for the first two ships.
- May 1920: The newly erected Odense Yard delivers its first ship, the Robert Mærsk.
- 1921: Odense Yard delivers its first diesel-powered vessel Leise Maersk to A.P. Møller.
- 1926: A.P. Møller enters into the tanker business and orders 5 motor tankers with 8,100 and 11,200 tdw.
- 1928: A.P. Møller begins the first liner service under the Name Mærsk Line with 6 motor ships, each 6000-7000 tdw on the Trans Pacific Route Far East – US West coast and via the Panama Canal to Baltimore.
- Feb. 1928: A.P. Møller gets its first tanker, the 11.200 tdw motor tanker Emma Mærsk, built by Burmeister & Wain, Copenhagen.
- March 1928: Odense Yard builds its first tanker, the 8,000 tdw M.T. Anna Mærsk.
- 1930: A.P. Møller becomes the co-owner of the weapons factory Riffelsyndikatet. In the following years he increases his share from 15 to 31.6%, to become the largest shareholder.
- 1934: Mærsk Line gets the 9,000 tdw cargo motorship Nora Mærsk from Odense Yard, but after 2 years of service it sinks due to a fire in Indonesia.
- Dec. 1936: The 16,500 tdw motortanker Eleonora Mærsk is delivered from the Deutsche Werft, Hamburg-Finkenwerder and is the biggest ship of the Mærsk fleet and also the largest single-crew motorship in the world.
- 1936: With the M.S. Francine, A.P. Møller gets from Odense yard its first reefer vessel. It is chartered to J. Lauritzen A/S, Denmark.
- 1937: Mærsk Line receives two 9,000 tdw motor cargo ships from Bremer Vulkan. The vessels are named Marchen Mærsk and Grete Mærsk.

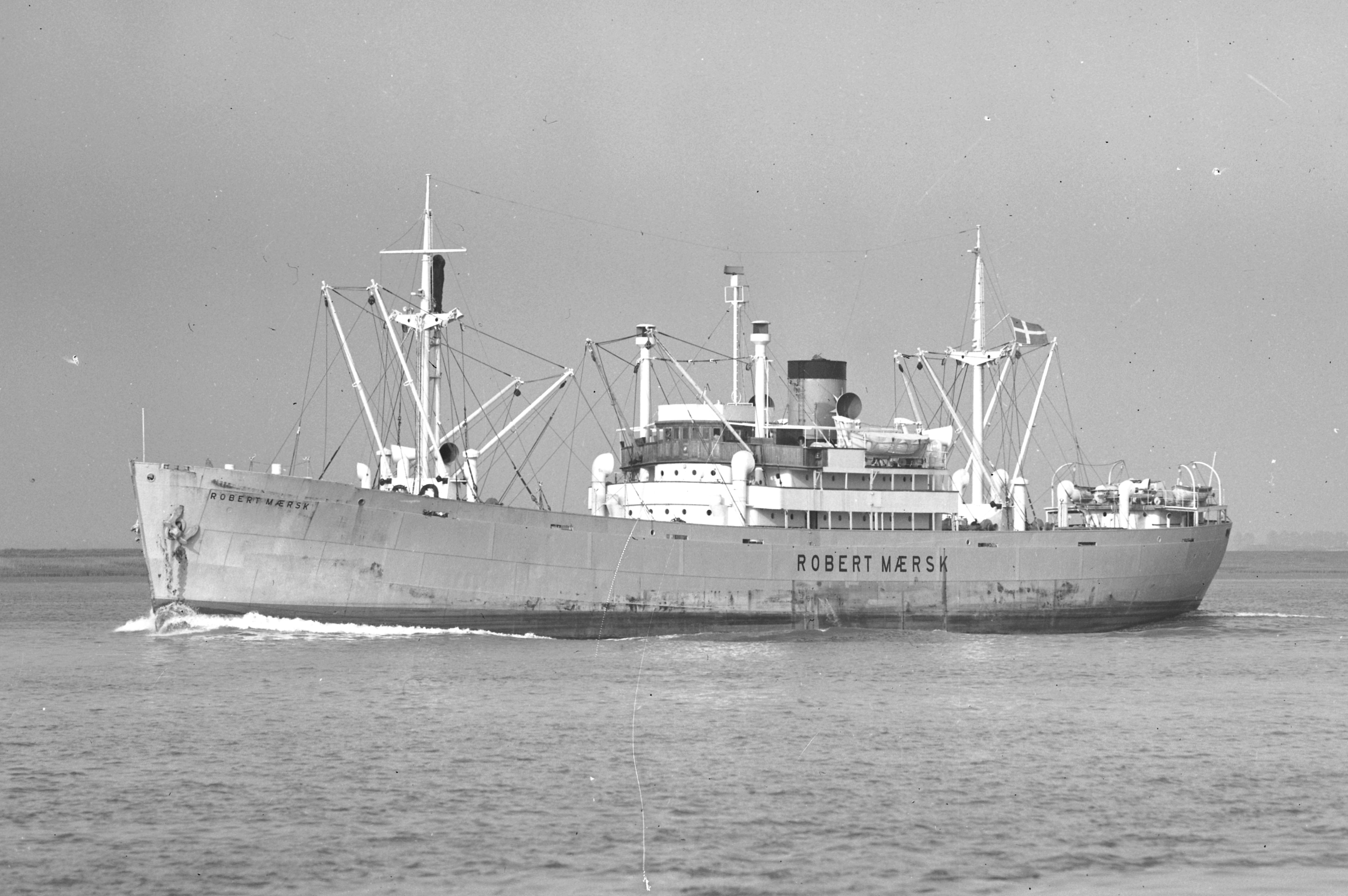
1937 built cargo ship Robert Mærsk on the river Scheldt

- 1937: Odense Yard delivers two 7,000 tdw white-painted hull cargo ships Gudrun Mærsk and Robert Mærsk with reefer capacity.
- Feb. 1939: Odense Yard delivers the 9,200 tdw M.S. Laura Mærsk the largest cargo ship to the Mærsk fleet.
- Sept. 1939: At the beginning of World War II, A.P. Møller is the second largest shipping company in Denmark with a total of 46 ships.
- April 1940: On 8 April 1940, A.P. Møller issues Permanent Special Instruction One to the 36 Mærsk ships on the high seas. Should Denmark become involved in war, all ships were to report directly to the New York office and follow its instructions. No orders from Copenhagen were to be followed if not approved by the New York office. On the next morning, 9 April 1940, Germany invades Denmark and Norway, and Denmark surrenders the same day. On 24 April, Mærsk Mc-Kinney Møller is made a partner in the company, and on 26 April he and his wife leave Denmark. Mærsk Mc-Kinney Møller manages the New York office throughout World War II.
- June 1941: The United States takes control of foreign ships and the Mærsk fleet serves in the US Navy for the rest of the war. More than half of the Mærsk fleet is lost during the war.
- 10 May 1943: The Riffelsyndikatet company is sabotaged by members of the Danish resistance. A.P. Møller travels personally to Stockholm and requests of Danish newspaper Politiken's correspondent that he "tells London to put an end to sabotage", which "is harmful to Danish interests".
- 22 June 1944: New sabotage action is taken by members of resistance group BOPA, who occupy Riffelsyndikatet and detonate a charge which prevents the resumption of production for the remainder of World War II .

== 1945–1965: Reconstruction following World War II ==
- June 1945: Mærsk's pre-WWII fleet had been reduced to just seven ships. Another 14 ships remained under the control of the US under the US shipping board until 1946.
- 9 Oct. 1945: The "Collaborationist Acts", (in Danish: Værnemagerlovene) III and IV are passed by the Danish Folketing. They demand that profits earned by companies dealing with Germany during the occupation and judged to be excessive, be paid back to the state. Riffelsyndikatet, and other A. P Møller-owned shipping and industrial companies such as the still extant Odense Steel Shipyard and the Bukh Motor Works are fined a total of approximately 10 million Danish kroner (the equivalent of about 150 million in 2004)
- 1947-48: A shipbuilding program is started. New vessels are ordered at yards in Denmark, Sweden, Germany, Italy, the Netherlands, Belgium, and Japan. Mærsk also takes over several US war-built ships of the U.S. Liberty and C-1 class and German-designed "Hansa A" and "Hansa B" class.
- 1953: Chastine Mærsk becomes the first of 13 motor ships in a new fast cargo ship class. The Mærsk fleet now has the same size as it had before World War II.
- 1954: The turbine tanker Regina Mærsk is launched, setting a new size-record for the Odense Yard. It is also the first Mærsk vessel with a blue-painted hull.
- 1956: The S.S. Hans Mærsk (built 1916) is sold after 40 years of service in the Mærsk fleet.
- 1959: The newly constructed Odense Lindø Yard, located in Munkebo around 10 km away from the old yard, opens. It has two large building docks and begins with laying the keel for two 50,000 tdw tankers.
- 1961: The first ships built at Lindø are five 50,000 tdw turbine tankers produced for Standard Oil of California and three for the Mærsk Line. Until 1977, the Yard mostly produced 100,000 tdw tankers. From 1968, 200,000 and 250,000 tdw tankers are produced, from 1971 280,000 tdw tankers, and ultimately 330,000 tdw tankers are produced as well.
- 1962: The Danish government grants A.P. Møller a license to search for oil in the Danish part of the North Sea. At the time, almost nobody expects any oil to be found. A new oil company, Mærsk Olie og Gas A/S, is later founded.
- 1962 – 1963: Three ships of the Trein Mærsk-class enters service. At the time, they were the company's largest cargo liners.
- 1964: Dansk Supermarked A/S is founded.
- 1965: A.P. Møller's Odense Yard produces its first product tankers Dangulf Mærsk and Svengulf Mærsk.

== 1965 – 1993: Mærsk Mc-Kinney Møller takes the helm ==
- 1966: The Bulkcarrier Laura Mærsk (yard no. 177) is the last ship produced at the old Odense Yard. The old yard is closed.
- 1967: A.P. Møller produces its first supply vessel, Mærsk Supplier.
- 1967 : The Odense Lindø Yard is enlarged with a new 90 x 420 m construction dock with a great gantry crane. This enables the construction of VLCC tankers, later ULCC Tankers, and now Ultra-Post-Panamax container ships.
- Nov. 1967 – 1969: Mærsk Line produces the last class of seven fast conventional motor cargo vessels, the Cecilie Mærsk-class. At test runs, they reach a maximum of 26 knots. They are used in the Europe-Far East service and in the Trans-Pacific service. In 1974, they are converted to semi-container ships, and following a large modification programme, as full container ships in 1980.
- 1968: Odense Lindø Yard builds its first 200,000 tdw tanker, Dirch Mærsk.
- 1969: Maersk Air is founded and begins operations the following year.

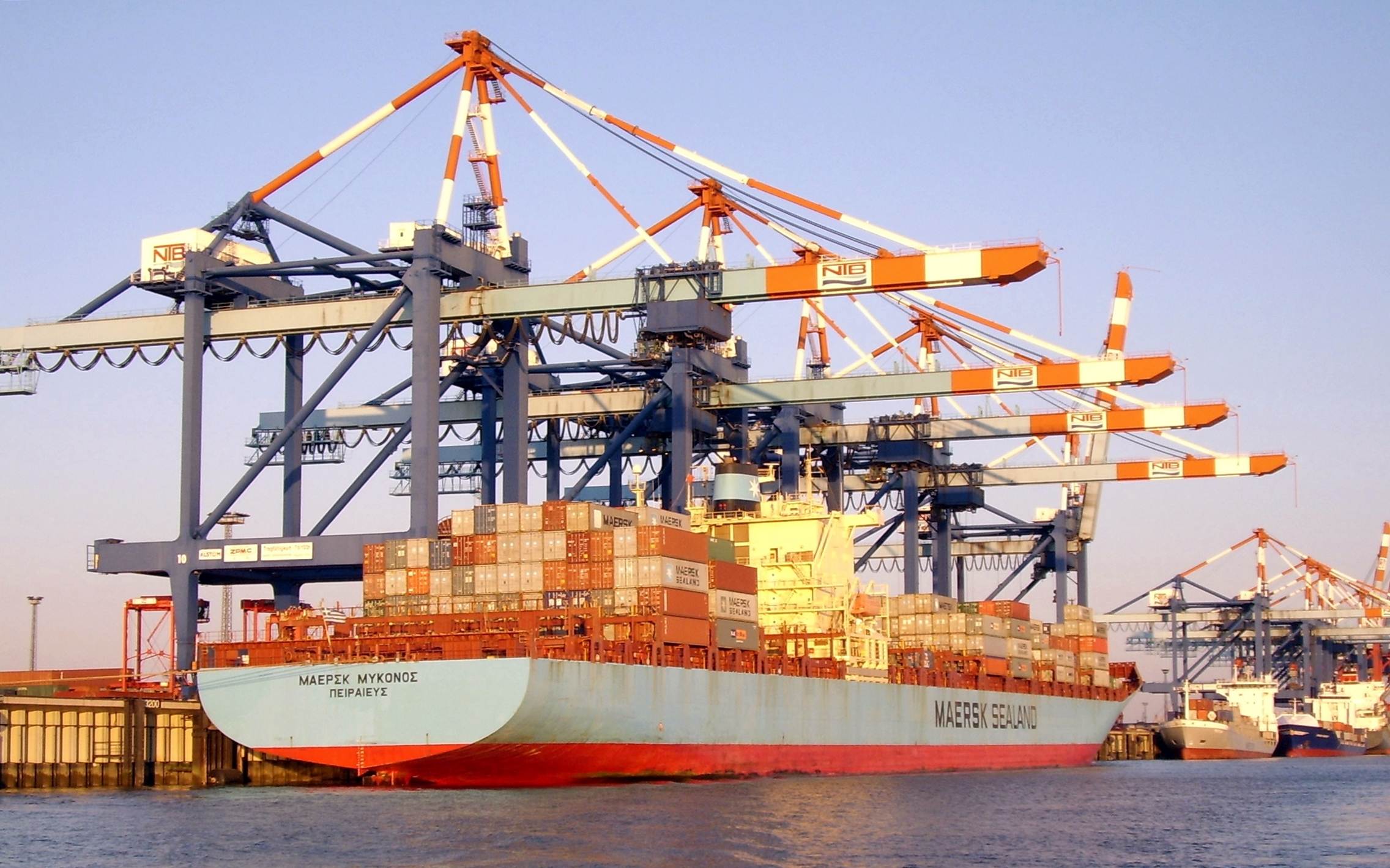
M-class vessel "Maersk Mykonos" at NTB Bremerhaven, July 2006

- July 1971: Odense Yard produces the 283,000 tdw turbine tanker Regina Mærsk, the biggest ship in Europe.
- 1972: The first gas tanker for A.P. Møller, Inge Mærsk enters service.
- 1973: Mærsk Line adds its first container ship to the fleet, the Japanese-constructed Svendborg Mærsk (1,800 twenty-foot equivalent units (TEU)).
- July 1974: Odense Yard builds the turbine tanker Kristine Mærsk (330,000 tdw), the biggest tanker in Europe. Six more vessels of this class are built for A.P. Møller until 1977.
- 1975: The Clara Mærsk rescues 3500 refugees fleeing the end of the Vietnam War and brings them to Hong Kong.
- Aug. 1975-1976: Mærsk Line receives nine fast single screw 1,200 TEU turbine container ships, the Adrian Mærsk-class, from the German shipyards Blohm & Voss (Hamburg) and Flenderwerft (Lübeck) for use in the trans-Pacific service. They are designed by United Ship Design & Development Centre in Taiwan.
- April 1979: Construction of the new company headquarters at Esplanaden is completed.
- 1980: Six Odense built RORO-container ships (Elisabeth Mærsk-class) are added to the Mærsk fleet.
- January 1981: Mærsk Line opens its own container service on the Europe-Far East route with the first container ship built at Odense Yard, Laura Mærsk (2,000 TEU). Ten sister ships join the fleet until 1985.
- 1988: A.P. Møller opens a container factory in Tinglev, Denmark.
- 1988: Mærsk begins a trans-Atlantic container service.
- April 1988: Odense Yard produces the Marchen Mærsk (4,300 TEU), the largest containership of the world. Eleven more ships are built between 1988 and 1991.
- 1989: Mærsk Line introduces the 45' container as a third standard container size.
- 1991-1996: Mærsk and P & O begin a joined global container service.
- 1992: The first large gas carrier Inger Mærsk (80,000 cbm) is added to the fleet.
- Dec. 1992: Odense Yard produces the world's first double-hull 300,000 tdw tanker, Eleo Mærsk. Until 1995, 5 sister ships are produced for Mærsk Line and 3 additional for Saudi Arabian VELA.

== 1993 – 1999: Bigger and bigger ==
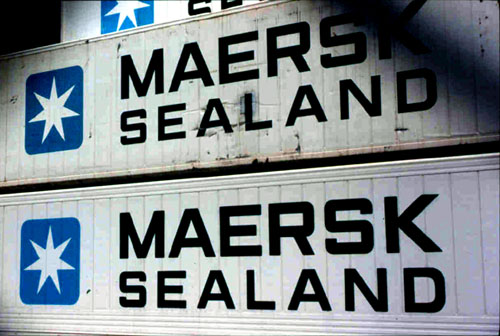
Mærsk Sealand 40' Containers

- March 1993: Mærsk Line takes over the EacBen Container Line Ltd. with 9 large container ships. It becomes the largest container business in the world.
- Dec. 1995: Hyundai H.I., Ulsan delivers the 4,300 TEU Panamax container ship Dragør Mærsk, the first of a series of 16 ships for Mærsk Line.
- Jan. 1996: The world's largest container ship, Regina Mærsk, is delivered from Odense Yard and begins the Europe – Far East liner service. At this time it holds many records: first ship more than 6,000 TEU capacity, with a length of 318.2 meters, it is the first container ship more than 300 meters; first with 42.80 m breadth and first over 80,000 BRZ and tdw.
- May 1996: The Mærsk cooperation of the liner service with P&O is ended and a new global containerservice with Sealand Corporation is started.
- Sept. 1997: Odense Yard delivers Sovereign Maersk, the world's first 8,000 TEU and more than 100,000 tdw container ship to the Mærsk fleet. It is also 346 meters long; the longest ship in the world at that time.
- 31 January 1998: A.P. Møller Group acquires the Volkswerft in Stralsund (Germany) from the German Treuhand for 25 million dollars. The yard is completely modernized, including a large shipbuilding hall and a 230 m (now 275 m length) ship lift to launch the ships. Container ships (2,500 class) are produced for the Mærsk fleet. They have a size of 2,900-3,000 TEU. Supply vessels and cable-laying vessels are also produced.
- February 1999: Mærsk takes control of the Safmarine container line, including the Compagnie Maritime Belge (CMB) with 50 owned and chartered container vessels.
- 1999: First vessel from mainland China (People's Republic of China), a 35,000 tdw R-class tanker built at Guangzhou Shipyard International.

== 1999 – 2005: Mærsk-Sealand ==
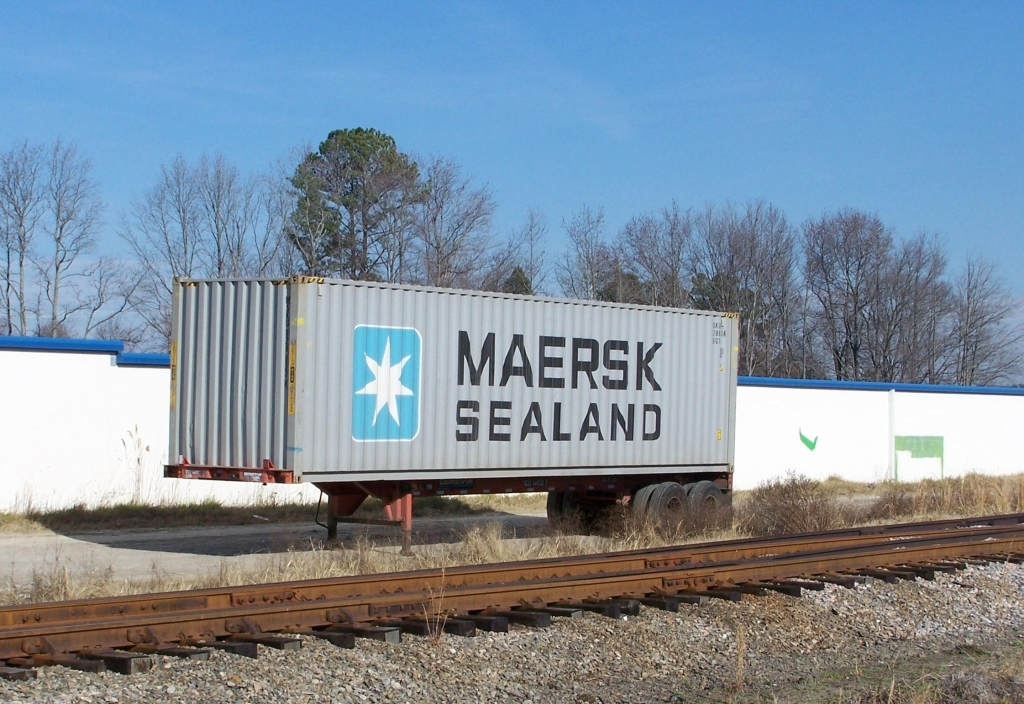
Maersk Sealand container on a trailer

- November 1999: Mærsk buys container shipper Sea-Land Corporation with 70 vessels, container terminals and liner service from the CSX Corporation. The new name of the shipping company is Mærsk Sealand.
- June 2001: Mærsk buys the Dutch Smit-Wijsmüller salvage company (including the Esbjerg, Denmark-based ESVAGT company) over its subsidiary company A/S Em Z. Svitzer with more than 250 vessels (tugs, barges, offshore and other vessels). The Mærsk group now operates the world's largest fleet of salvage and offshore vessels.
- September 2002: Mærsk takes over the shipping liner activities of the Danish shipping company Dampskibsselskabet TORM, which sails from the United States to the Persian Gulf and from the Eastern seaboard of the United States to the west coast of Africa. Within the Mærsk group, the routes are now operated by Safmarine.
- 2003: The two holding companies Dampskibsselskabet Svendborg A/S and Dampskibsselskabet af 1912 A/S are merged to A.P. Møller-Mærsk A/S.
- March 2003: Odense Yard produces Axel Mærsk, at the time, the world's biggest and longest container ship. It also has the world's largest cargo capacity. It is the first container ship with 352 m Loa. Its width is 42.80 m, it carries 109,000 tdw, with a 12-cylinder HSD-Wärtsilä Sulzer diesel engine, developing 63,000 kW at 100 revolutions per minute – equivalent to 85,500 BHP. Five sister ships are built between 2003-2004 (Anna Mærsk, Arnold Mærsk, Arthur Mærsk, Adrian Mærsk, and Albert Mærsk).
- April 2004 : The first LNG-carrier (120,000 cbm) with the name Mærsk Ras Laffan from Samsung Heavy Ind. South Korean enters the Mærsk fleet. A sister ship is ordered for 2006.
- May – Oct. 2004: Volkswerft builds three containerships of each 2100 TEU for Safmarine.
- 2004: The company headquarters at Esplanaden are enlarged and opens in February 2005.
- 2004 – 2005: Odense Yard builds its first naval ships with two flex-support-ships (Loa. 137.5 m) for the Royal Danish Navy.
  - In 2004, the group had revenues of about 157,112 million DKK (21,138 million euros). In 2004, Mærsk made a net profit of DKK 18.4 billion (US$3.1 billion). It is listed on the KFX-index of the Copenhagen Stock Exchange. In 2004, the company had a 12% share of the world's container shipping market.
- March 2005: Odense Yard delivers the Post-Panamax-Containership DAL Kalahari for Deutsche-Afrika-Linien, the first ship which is not built for the Mærsk Group for ten years.

== 2005 – present ==
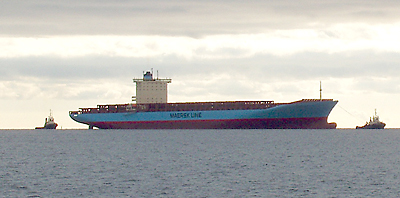
9500 TEU container ship Gunvor Mærsk of the Gudrun Maersk class

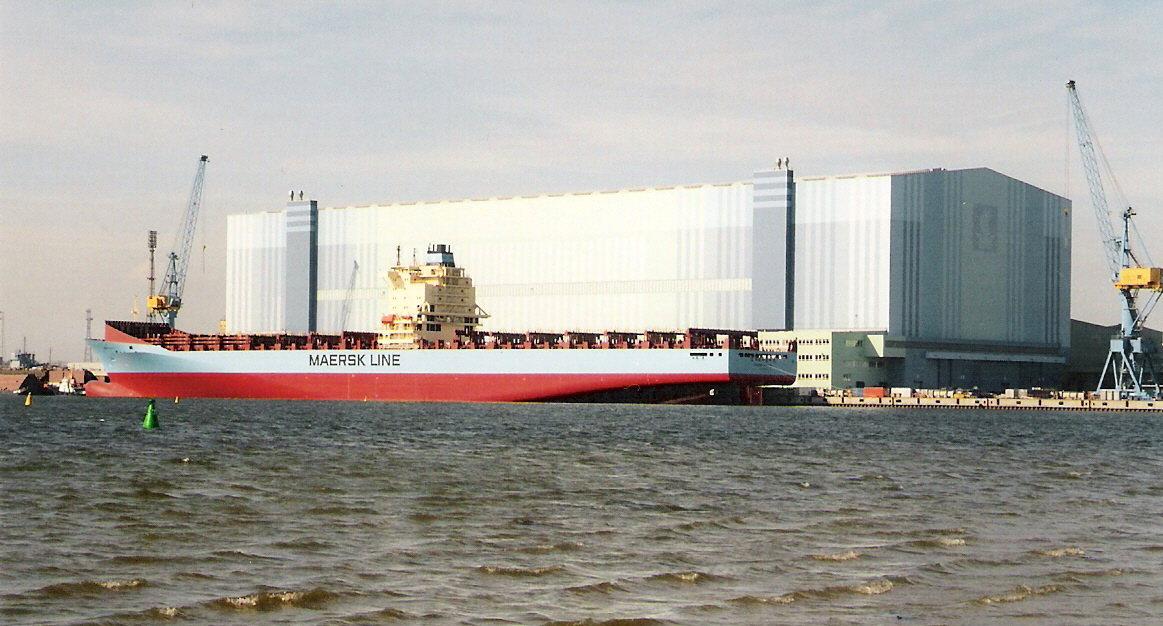
Mærsk Boston before sea trials at Volkswerft Stralsund.

- 11 May 2005: Mærsk announces plans to purchase the rival shipping company P&O Nedlloyd for 2.3 billion euros (US$2.96 billion). Some analysts believe the purchase is inspired by the undercapacity of the world container market. World trade is currently growing faster than ships are being built. By buying another large company, Mærsk will be able to expand its capacity by a third. With this purchase, Mærsk will be by far the largest single shipping company and the largest container line in the world with more than 550 vessels. From 11 May to 24 June 2005, Mærsk acquired 19.4% of Royal P&O Nedlloyd stocks.
- June 2005: Odense Yard produces the Gudrun Mærsk for the Mærsk fleet, again setting a world record for biggest and longest container ship. It will serve on the Europe–Far East liner service.
- 29 June 2005: P&O sells its last 25% share of Nedlloyd stocks to A.P. Møller and the two Scandinavian banks Danske Bank and Nordea.
- 29 June 2005: A.P. Møller subsidiary Norfolkline acquires the Irish sea ferry operator Norse Merchant Ferries with 9 ships.
- 30 June 2005: A.P. Møller-Mærsk agrees to sell Maersk Air to Fons Eignarhaldsfélag, Iceland.
- 11 August 2005: A.P. Møller-Mærsk announces that the purchase of Royal P&O Nedlloyd N.V. has been completed. The company will be merged with Mærsk-Sealand. Royal P&O Nedlloyd has a fleet of 162 container vessels with 460,203 TEU. From February 2006, the new company will be named Mærsk Line. P&O Nedlloyd Logistics and Mærsk Logistics will be merged under the name Mærsk Logistics.
- May 2006: The Volkswerft Stralsund delivers the first of a series of seven very fast 29 kn 4250 TEU Panamax Container ship, the Maersk Boston.
- 12 August 2006: Maersk again exceeds the world record for largest container ship with the 11,000 TEU Emma Mærsk built at Odense Steel Shipyard.
- 3 March 2007: Evelyn Mærsk launched, joining sister ships Emma Mærsk, Elly Mærsk, Eleonora Mærsk, and Estelle Mærsk.
- 8 January 2008: Maersk Line, the container shipping division of the A.P. Moller – Maersk Group, announces details of its new streamLINE strategy to drive the turnaround of the business and return to sustainable profitability. There will be a reduction of 2–3,000 positions worldwide, along with a reduction in the number of regional organizations.
- February 2011: Maersk announced orders for a new "Triple E" series of containerships, which would be the world's largest (at 18,000 TEU), with an emphasis on lower fuel consumption.
- 14 February 2014: Accident in the Bay of Biscay: Container ship Svendborg loses about 520 40'-containers, 85% of them empty, others containing non-dangerous goods in a 60 knot storm.
- 2017: By the summer of 2017, A.P. Moeller-Maersk A/S was the world's biggest containership operator. However, after a major cyberattack in June 2017, by July 2017, the company was "struggling to restore its global computer network" and was forced to rely on telephone calls and texts to maintain operations. Disruption from the NotPetya ransomware attack was expected to cost Maersk about $250 million.
- January 2023: It was announced Mærsk had completed the acquisition of the Aarhus-headquartered project logistics services provider, Martin Bencher Group.
- February 2023: Maersk introduced Stay Ahead 3.0, a new organizational structure. The following brands to be re-branded as Maersk: Sealand, Hamburg Süd and Twill brands as well as the brands of acquired companies including Senator, LF Logistics, Martin Bencher, Performance Team, KGH and Pilot.
- 14 September 2023:The world’s first methanol-enabled container vessel was named LAURA MÆRSK by the EU Commission President Ursula von der Leyen at a ceremony in Copenhagen.
- 26 January 2024:ANE MÆRSK, the world’s first large methanol-enabled container vessel is named at a ceremony in the shipyard of HD Hyundai Heavy Industries (HD HHI) in Ulsan, South Korea.
- 4 April 2024: In a ceremony held in Yokohama, Japan, Maersk’s second large dual fuel container vessel, the ASTRID MÆRSK, was christened in a name-giving ceremony with Mrs. Liza Uchida, spouse of Nissan CEO Makoto Uchida.
- 27 August 2024: Maersk christened the Alette Maersk, a 350-meter-long cargo ship with a capacity of over 16,000 TEU, at the Port of Los Angeles. Built in South Korea, this vessel is the first dual-fuel methanol-enabled container ship to arrive in the U.S. Olympic gold-medalist snowboarder Chloe Kim was named the ‘godmother’ of the Alette Maersk. Kim is recognized for her environmental advocacy and a member of Protect Our Winters, a non-profit organization consisting of athletes, scientists, and creatives committed to raising awareness and promoting action on climate issues.
- October 2024: Dual-fuel methanol vessel Alexandra Maersk was christened at the Port of Felixstowe, United Kingdom. Elaine Condon, Director of People & Culture at Primark, served as the ship's godmother. The vessel is named after Alexandra Mærsk-Møller, the elder sister of company founder, Arnold Peter Møller.
- January 2024: It was announced that Hapag-Lloyd, together with Maersk, would launch a long-term operational cooperation under the name Gemini Cooperation in February 2025. The new cooperation is expected to comprise around 340 ships with a combined capacity of 3.7 million standard containers (TEU); of these, Maersk is to provide 60% and Hapag-Lloyd 40%.
- November 2024: The Maersk Halifax container ship was converted into a dual-fuel methanol vessel at the Zhoushan Xinya Shipyard in China, marking the world’s first retrofit of this kind. Maersk also introduced the dual-fuel methanol vessel A.P. Møller at a naming ceremony in Singapore. It is the ninth such vessel in Maersk's fleet and is named after company founder Arnold Peter Møller.

== See also ==
- List of container shipping companies by ship fleets and containers
- List of petroleum companies
