= Laura Maersk =

Laura Maersk is the name of multiple cargo ships, originally operated by Mærsk line:

- SS Laura (1875), steamship, originally built as the Roll Call. Acquired by Peter Mærsk-Møller in 1886 and renamed Laura. The ship was the first to bear the white seven pointed star emblem of the Maersk company.
- Laura Mærsk (1966), a bulk carrier.
- MV Shughart (1980), originally built as Laura Maersk in 1980, now a Large, Medium-Speed Roll-on/Roll-off ship operated by the United States Navy.
- Laura Mærsk (2001), a container ship, renamed as Louis Maersk in 2023
- Laura Maersk (2023), a dual fuel (methanol and diesel) container ship.
