= Laura Maersk (2023) =

Danish Container Ship

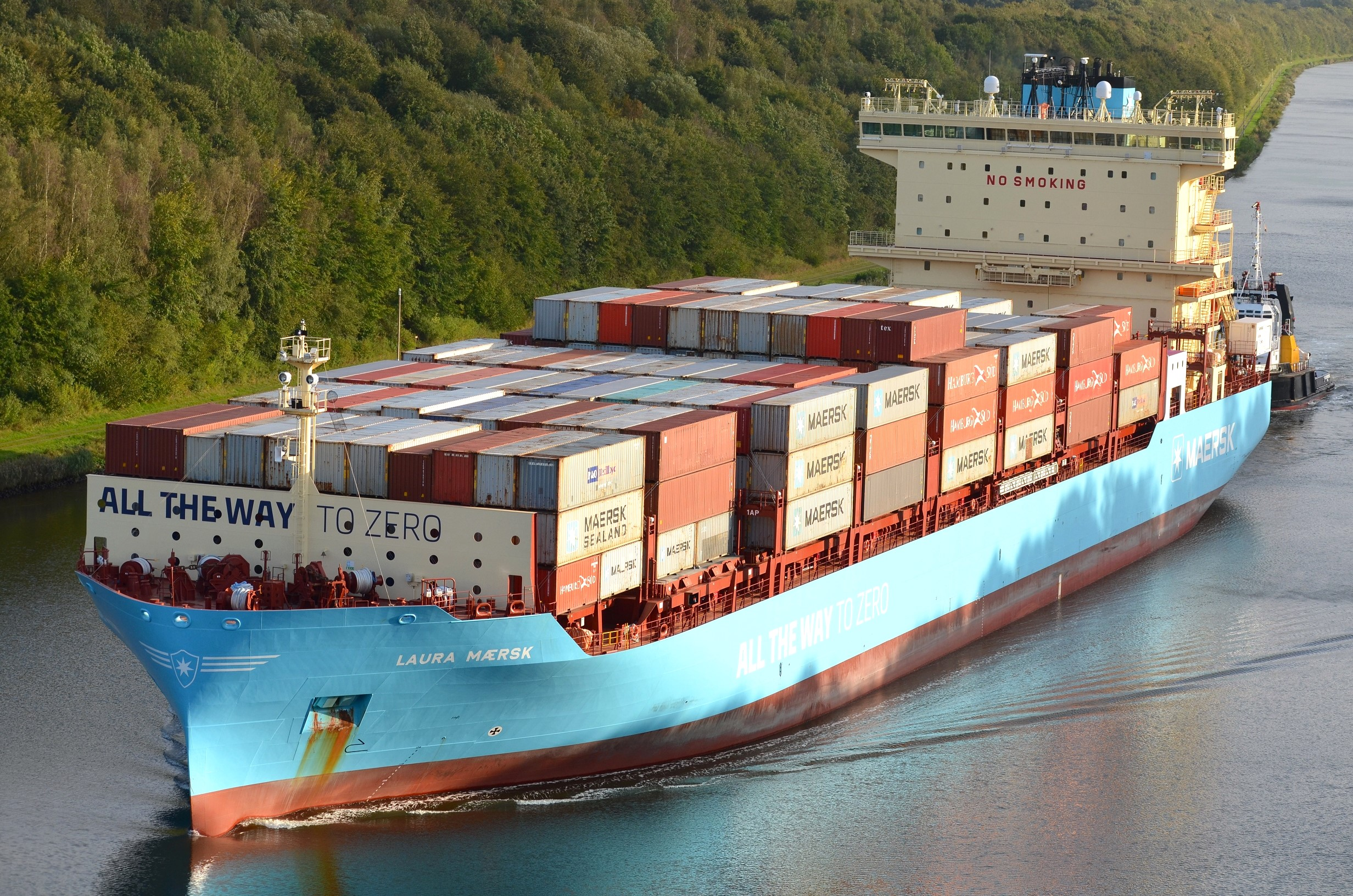

History
- Name: Laura Maersk
- Namesake: SS Laura
- Owner: Maersk
- Port of registry: (Denmark)
- Builder: Hyundai Mipo Dockyard
- Launched: 4 April 2023
- Christened: 14 September 2023
- Identification: IMO number: 9944546; MMSI number: 219543000; Callsign: OZGV2
- Status: In service

General characteristics
- Type: Container ship
- Tonnage: 25,750 GT
- Length: 172 m (564 ft 4 in)
- Beam: 32 m (105 ft 0 in)
- Capacity: 2,100 TEU

Laura Maersk is methanol fuel-enabled feeder container ship launched in 2023. Owned by Maersk, It is the world's first container ship to be powered by a methanol-fuel engine.

== Background ==
Laura Maersk was built as a dual fuel (methanol and diesel) container ship in Hyundai Mipo Dockyard, South Korea.

It was named by President of the European Commission Ursula von der Leyen in Copenhagen on 14 September 2023. It is named after the steam ship SS Laura, the first ship owned by Peter Mærsk Møller, father of the founder of Maersk. It is world's first methanol fuel-enabled container ship and is part of Maersk's objective of having a fleet that operates solely on green fuels.

== Description ==
Laura Maersk is 172 m (564 ft 4 in) long, 32 m (105 ft 0 in) wide and has a gross tonnage of 25,750 GT. Both its main engine, developed by MAN Energy Solutions in partnership with Hyundai Heavy Industries, and its auxiliary Hyundai Heavy Industries Hi-touch Marine & Stationary Engine are capable of running on methanol and diesel. Maersk aims to use green methanol to fuel Laura Maersk, initially from Rotterdam, Netherlands until production is enabled in Denmark. The ship has a capacity of 2,100 TEU.

== See also ==
- MS Stena Germanica
- MV Shughart
