= Martin Bencher =

Scandinavian shipping and freight forwarding company

Martin Bencher (Scandinavia) A/S
- Type: Private
- Industry: Shipping and Freight Forwarding
- Founded: 1997; 29 years ago
- Founders: Peter Thorsoe Jensen & Bo Drewsen
- Headquarters: Aarhus, Denmark, Aarhus, Denmark
- Number of locations: Europe, Asia, North America, South America, South East Asia, Middle East
- Services: General Freight Forwarding; Shipping; Engineering and Project Management; Cargo Handling and Technical Services; Port and Agency Services; Inland Services; Oversized / heavy cargo
- Number of employees: App. 140 (October 2016)
- Parent: Maersk (2023-present)
- Website: www.martin-bencher.com

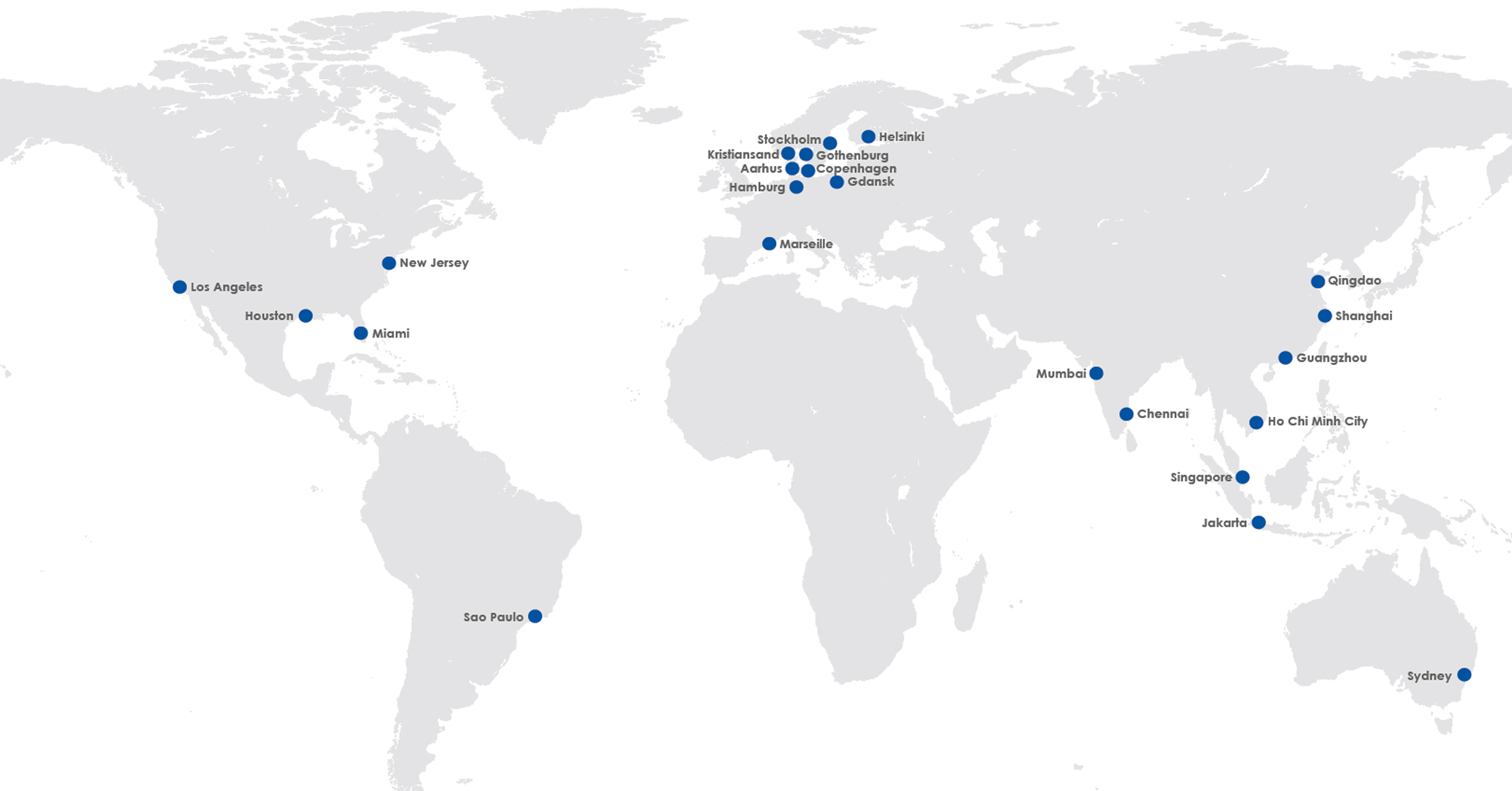
Map of Martin Bencher offices worldwide

Martin Bencher (Scandinavia) A/S is a Scandinavian shipping and freight forwarding company, which was founded in the United Kingdom in 1881.

Founded in 1997 by No H. Drewsen and Peter Thorson Jensen, Martin Bencher Group was acquired by Maersk in 2023.

== History ==
Martin Bencher History
1881 - Martin Bencher Ltd is a shipping and freight forwarding company originally established in 1881 in the UK. In those days a person named Martin Bencher started his own transport service between the UK and continental Europe.
1997 - Martin Bencher (Scandinavia) A/S is founded in Aarhus, Denmark by Mr. Peter Thorsoe Jensen and Mr. Bo H. Drewsen, offering freight forwarding and shipping services mainly to Scandinavian customers. The main business is transportation of project cargo to China. A Martin Bencher office opens in Shanghai, China.
1999 - Martin Bencher offices are opened in Helsinki, Finland and Stockholm, Sweden.
2000 - A Martin Bencher office is opened in Gdansk, Poland.
2003 - A Martin Bencher office is opened in New Jersey, USA.
2005 - Martin Bencher is awarded with recognised Danish Gazelle Award. The Gazelle Award represents business growth.
2007 - Martin Bencher opens offices in Ho Chi Minh City, Vietnam and Jakarta, Indonesia. Another two Martin Bencher offices are opened in China; in Qingdao and Tianjin.
2008 - Offices opened in Singapore, Guangzhou, China and Miami, USA.
2009 - Offices opened in Hamburg, Germany and Beijing, China. Shanghai Representative office was changed to Branch office or WOFE (Wholly Foreign Owned Enterprise), named Martin Bencher International Transport (Shanghai) LTD. Martin Bencher is awarded with the Danish Gazelle Award for the second time as the company has shown growth rates of impressive 259.3% over the past four years. The Norwegian department is opened with office location in Aarhus, Denmark.
2010 - Office opened in Houston, USA
2011 - Office opened in Marseille, France and São Paulo, Brazil. Martin Bencher has become a corporate sponsor of WWF Denmark
2012 - Martin Bencher Group experiences the best result in the history of the company - despite the financial crisis. There are now more than one hundred Martin Bencher employees globally. Martin Bencher opens offices in Gothenburg, Sweden and Long Beach/Los Angeles, USA.
2013 - Martin Bencher officially integrates the UN Global Compact´s ten principles into the core business strategy. Martin Bencher is one of the forty-two founding members of the CSR network ‘My Danish footprint in China’. The objective of the network is to encourage, support and promote Danish companies working with CSR in China. Martin Bencher is ISO 9001:2008 certified (certificate number: DK003214-1). Martin Bencher opens an office in Sydney, Australia. Martin Bencher participates in Women’s International Shipping and Trading Association (WISTA) Seminar.
2014 - Martin Bencher acquires TTI logistics ApS, an air freight service provider with more than 30 years of experience. The service is continued as Martin Bencher Airfreight ApS. A Martin Bencher office is opened in Kristiansand, Norway. Two offices are added to the Martin Bencher network in India through an exclusive agency agreement.
2015 - Offices opened in Kuala Lumpur, Malaysia, London, United Kingdom, Bangkok, Thailand, and Dubai, United Arab Emirates.
2016 - Martin Bencher headoffice moved from Balticagade to Vandvejen 7, level 4, 8000 Aarhus C, Denmark. The company appointed a COO, CCO and a CFO.
2023 - Martin Bencher Group was acquired by Maersk.

== Business areas ==
Martin Bencher Group transports all kinds of cargo - and specialize in the handling of PROJECTS and OVERSIZED / HEAVY cargo.

=== General freight forwarding ===
Ocean Freight – Shipper Owned Container and Carrier Owned Container
FCL and LCL
Air Freight
Shipping documents
Customs clearance

=== Shipping ===
Vessel Chartering
Conventional, Heaavy lift, RoRo, Tug and barge cargo booking
Breakbulk cargo transportation by container ship
Container transport - standard and out of gauge
Transshipment management
Air-Sea transportation

=== Engineering and project management ===
Project Management
Risk management
Second hand plant relocation - deconstruct/transport/reconstruct
Temporary facilities - floating cranes, temporary piers, winter roads

=== Cargo handling and technical services ===
Packaging, lashing, cradles and lifting - technical advice
Floating cranes or crane vessels, low loaders, comettos, lifting and handling equipment
SOC sourcing - GP/FR/OT containers
vanning/devanning of containers
Cargo consolidation
Load planning
Cargo readiness survey/loading survey/discharging survey

=== Port and agency services ===
Port captain services
Port protecting agency services

=== Inland services ===
Multimodal delivery - Air, Sea, Road, Rail
Route survey
Loading and discharge planning
Transport permits
