= Gemini Cooperation =

Shipping alliance

The Gemini Cooperation is a strategic alliance between two shipping companies in the container transport sector. Since early 2025, Hapag-Lloyd and Maersk have been cooperating in freight transport to enable more punctual deliveries for customers and to meet the challenges of climate-neutral restructuring. One month earlier, both companies terminated their previous partnerships with other shipping companies.

However, the two container shipping companies will not be contributing their entire fleets to the alliance. Hapag-Lloyd owns around 270 ships and Maersk more than 670. The joint pool is to comprise 290 ships with a capacity of 3.4 million standard containers (TEU). Maersk will contribute 60 percent of this and Hapag-Lloyd the remaining 40 percent. Due to ongoing uncertainties in the Red Sea, the Gemini partners decided in October 2024 to avoid routes through this sea area and to introduce the Cape of Good Hope Network at the start of the cooperation. This will increase the shipping pool to around 340 ships with a total capacity of 3.7 million TEU. An important goal of the alliance is to achieve greater punctuality and reliability of the fleet.

The alliance was launched in February 2025. According to Hapag-Lloyd, schedule reliability of 92% was achieved in the first month.

From April 2025, the network the alliance runs has been called the East-West Network.

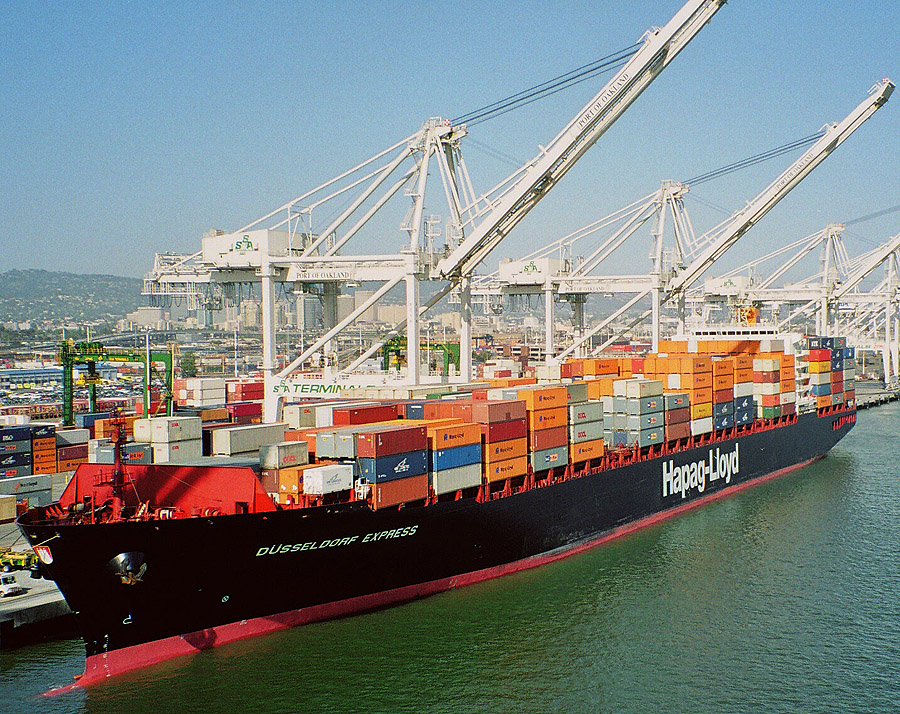
Container ship from Hapag-Lloyd

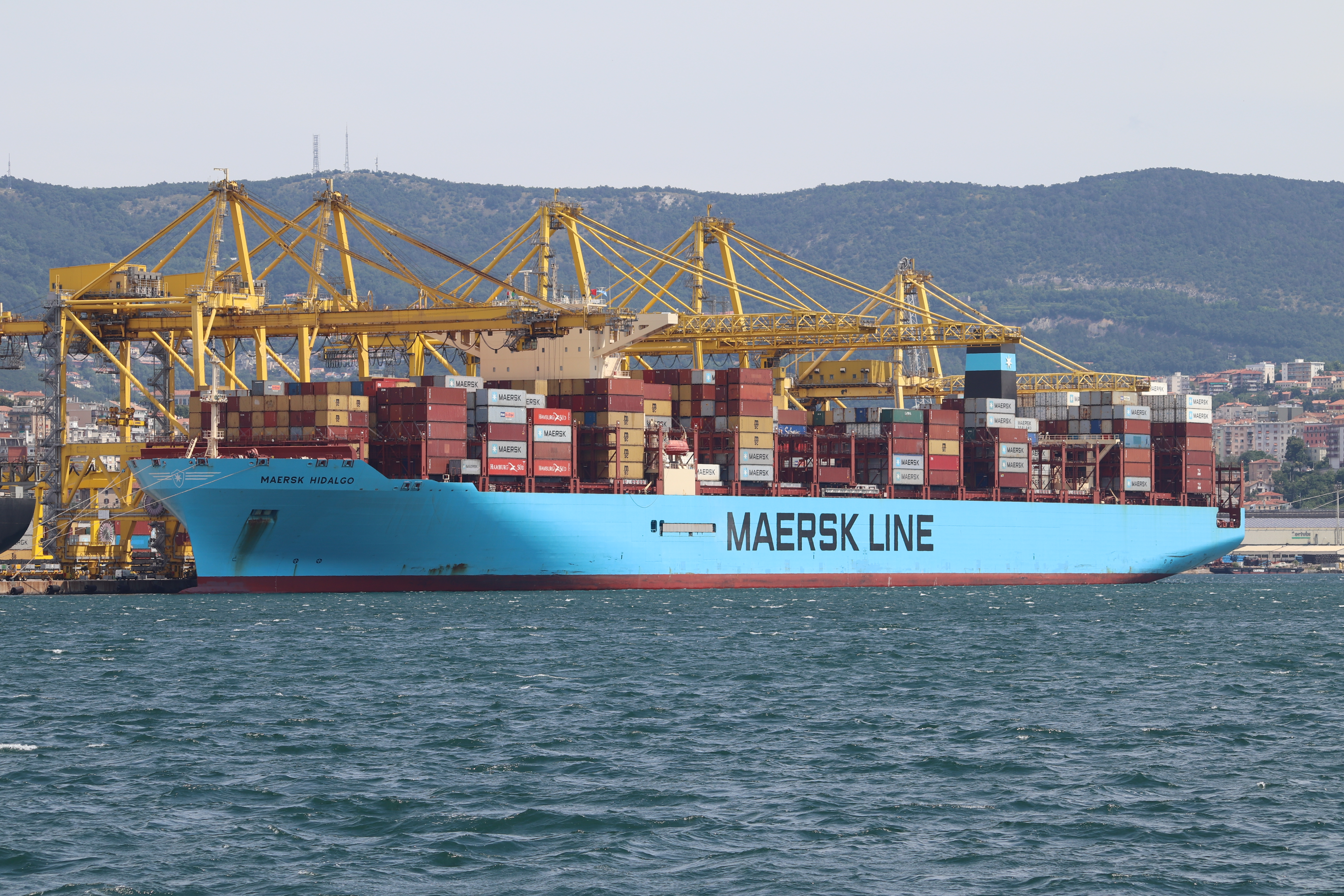
Maersk container ship
