= SS Laura (1875) =

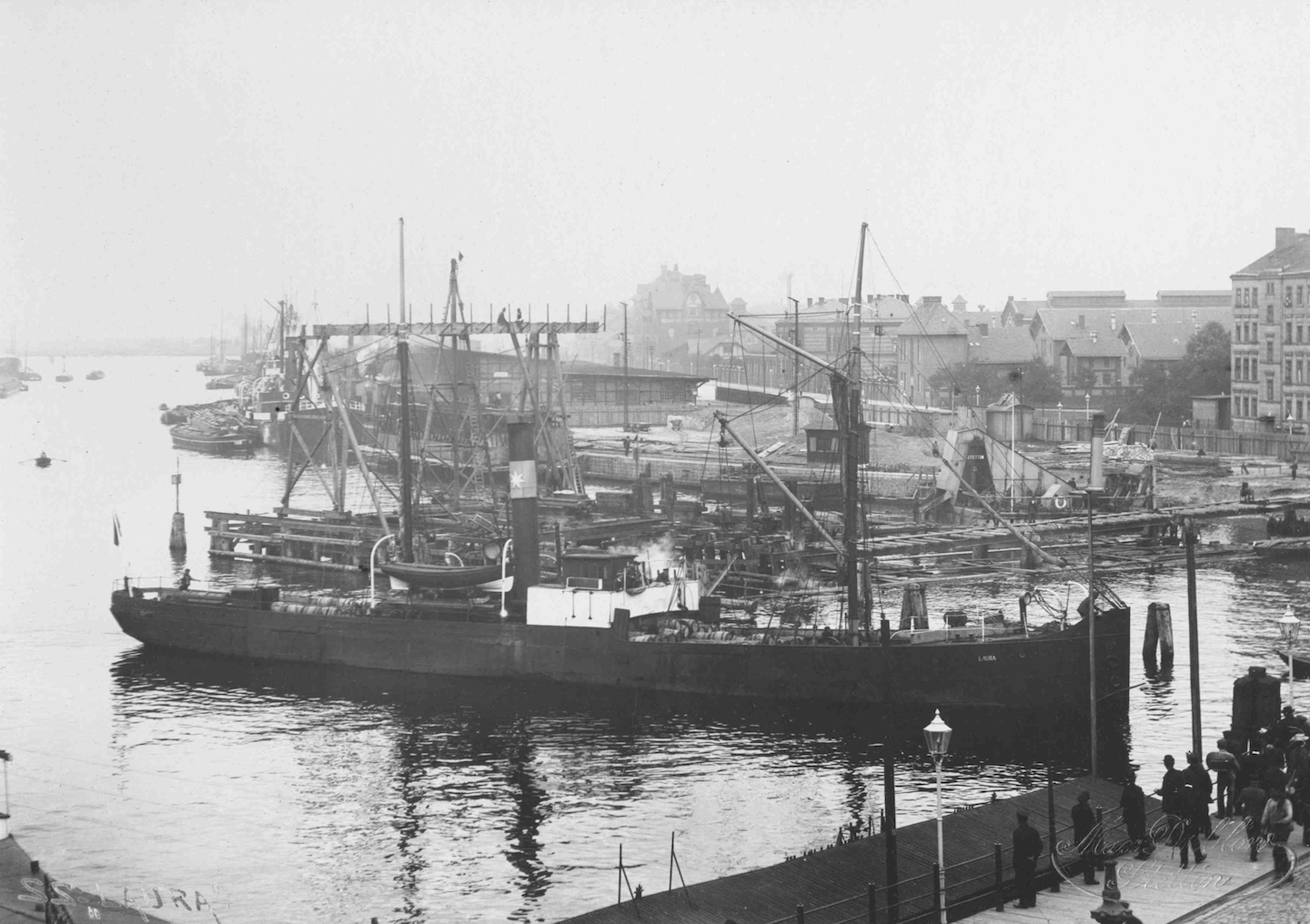
- Laura in Svendborg, 1886

History
- Name: Roll Call
- Ordered: Newcomb & Thomson
- Builder: J Readhead & Co, South Shields
- Yard number: 117
- Launched: 29 November 1875
- Fate: Acquired by O Prior & Co. 1881 and renamed Ellen

History
- Name: Ellen
- Owner: O Prior & Co.
- Port of registry: Copenhagen, Denmark
- Acquired: 1881

History
- Name: Laura
- Owner: Dampskibsselskabet Laura
- Port of registry: Svendborg, Denmark
- Acquired: 1886
- Identification: code letters NSWH
- Fate: Beached 27 August 1941

General characteristics
- Type: Cargo ship
- Tonnage: 266 GRT; 165 NRT
- Length: 135.5 feet (41.3 m)
- Beam: 19.7 feet (6.0 m)
- Draught: 10.0 feet (3.0 m)
- Installed power: 40 horsepower (30 kW) steam engine
- Propulsion: Single screw

SS Laura was an 1875-built steamship owned by Peter Mærsk-Møller. Originally built as the Roll Call by J Readhead & Co in South Shields, she was renamed Ellen in 1881 and then acquired by Peter Mærsk-Møller in 1886 and renamed Laura. The ship was the first to bear the white seven pointed star emblem of the Maersk company, which was created by Peter Mærsk-Møller's son Arnold Peter Møller.

== History ==
=== 1875 to 1881 ===
Roll Call was built in 1875 by John Readhead & Sons in South Shields, UK. Her iron hull was 135.9 feet (41.4 m) long, 19.7 feet (6.0 m) wide and had a draft of 10.0 feet (3.0 m). She was fitted with a 40-HP steam engine which powered a screw propeller.

=== 1881 to 1886 ===
In 1881 the ship was acquired by O Prior & Co and renamed Ellen; she was registered in Copenhagen with J Svendsen serving as captain.

=== 1886 to 1909 ===
In 1886 the ship was acquired by Dampskibsselskabet Laura (Danish for "Laura Steamship Company") and captain Peter Mærsk-Møller in Svendborg. In 1898 Peter Mærsk-Møller handed captaincy of the Laura to one of his sons, Hans Nielsen Jeppesen Møller. Peter Mærsk-Møller would go on to found Dampskibsselskabet Svendborg (Danish for "Svendborg Steamship Company") in 1904 with another of his sons Arnold Peter Møller, which would eventually become the shipping conglomerate Mærsk.

Peter Mærsk Møller attached a blue banner with a white seven pointed star to both sides of the funnel of Laura when his wife recovered from illness. In a letter to his wife, P.M. Møller explained in October 1886, "The little star on the chimney is a memory of the night when I prayed for you and asked for a sign: If a star would appear in the gray and cloudy sky, it would mean that the Lord answers prayers." The same star later became the emblem of the Maersk Group.

=== 1909 and beyond ===
In 1909 the ship was acquired by O Litzio of Catania and renamed Ignazio. By 1918 the ship was registered to A&E Halfon of Benghazi, Libya, and called Adele.

By World War II, Adele was under German control. On 27 August 1941, she was attacked and damaged by Soviet Navy motor torpedo boats and was beached to avoid sinking.
