= Maersk =

Danish shipping and logistics company

Coordinates: 55°41′14.81″N 12°35′53.28″E

A.P. Moller - Maersk A/S

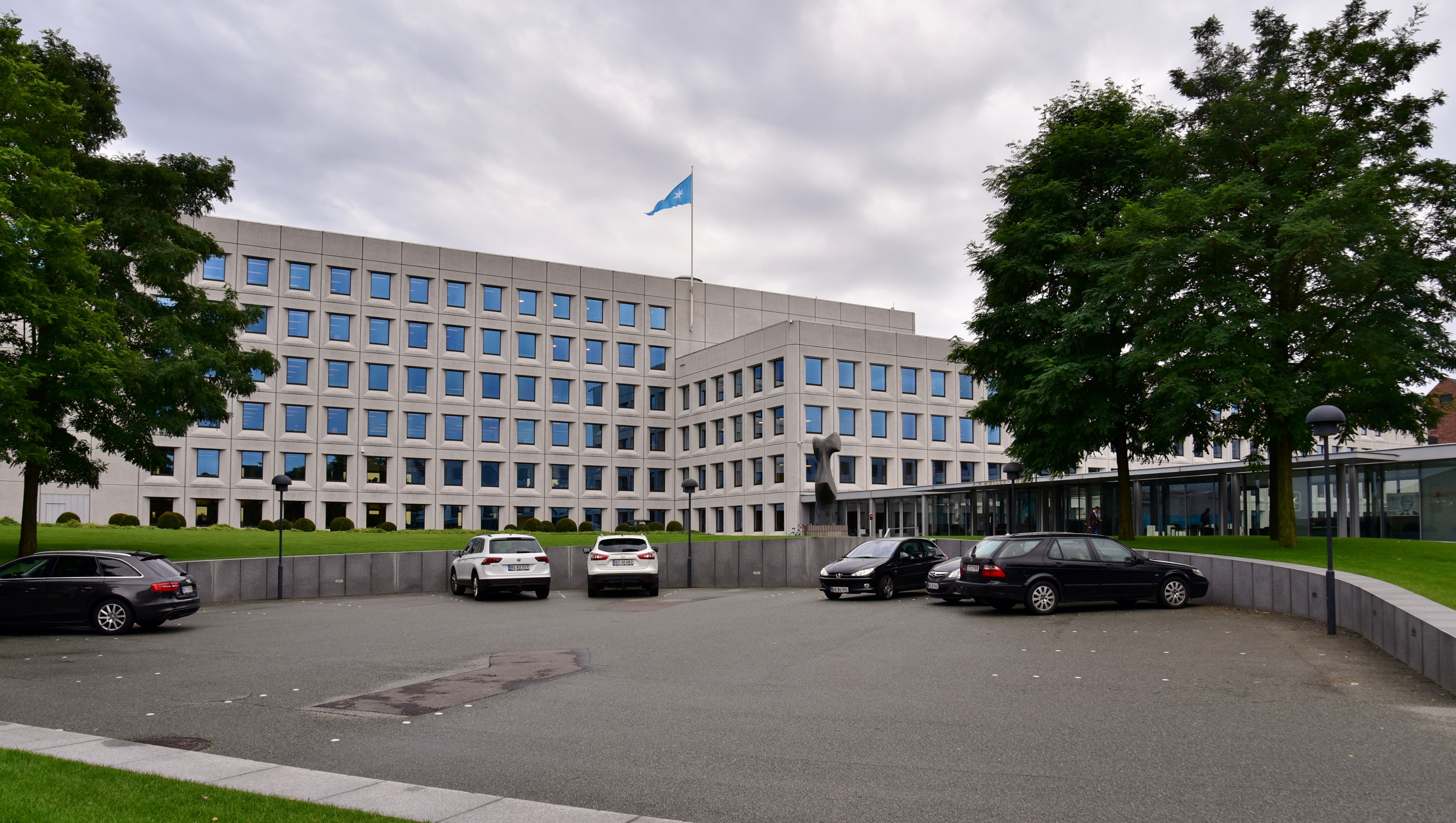
- Maersk head office
- Type: Publicly traded Aktieselskab
- Traded as: Nasdaq Copenhagen: MAERSK A; MAERSK B; OMXC25CAP component
- Industry: Freight transport
- Predecessor: Dampskibsselskabet Svendborg; Dampskibsselskabet af 1912
- Founded: 16 April 1904; 122 years ago, Svendborg, Denmark
- Founders: Arnold Peter Møller; Peter Mærsk Møller
- Headquarters: Esplanaden 50, 1263 Copenhagen K, Denmark
- Key people: Vincent Clerc (CEO)
- Products: Container shipping and terminals, logistics and freight forwarding, ferry and tanker transport, semi-submersible drilling rigs and FPSOs
- Revenue: US$53.988 billion (2025)
- Net income: US$2.915 billion (2025)
- Number of employees: 107,638 (2025)
- Subsidiaries: 900+
- Website: www.maersk.com

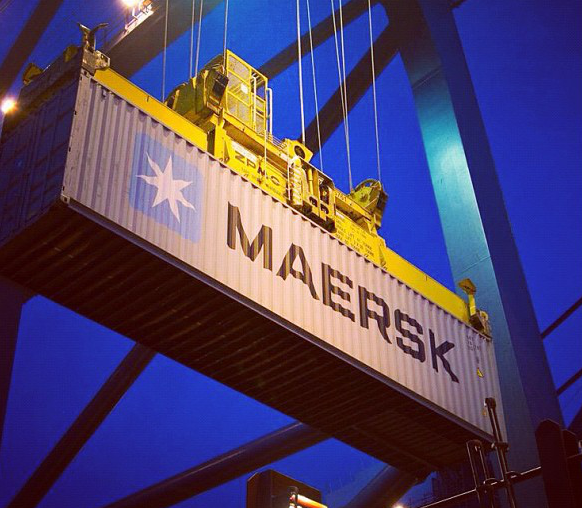
A Maersk Line 40ft container being lifted by a crane.

A.P. Moller - Maersk A/S (Note: Danish: [ˈɛˀ ˈpʰe̝ˀ ˈmølˀɐ ˈmɛɐ̯sk]; English: /mɛərsk/; MAIRSK) is a Danish shipping and logistics company founded in 1904 by Arnold Peter Møller and his father Peter Mærsk Møller.

Maersk's business activities include ocean shipping, port operation, supply chain management, warehousing and air freight. The company is based in Copenhagen, Denmark, with subsidiaries and offices across approximately 130 countries and more than 100,000 employees worldwide in 2025.

It is a publicly traded family business, as the company is controlled by the namesake Møller family through holding companies. The company's 2025 annual revenue was US$53.988 billion.

== History ==
Dampskibsselskabet Svendborg (Danish for 'Svendborg Steamship Company') was founded in Svendborg in April 1904 by captain Peter Mærsk Møller (1836–1927) and his son Arnold Peter (A. P.) Møller (1876–1965). A. P. Møller had four children, all by his first wife Chastine Estelle Roberta Mc-Kinney. Their second child was (Arnold) Mærsk Mc-Kinney Møller (1913–2012), who became a partner in 1939 and head of the firm upon his father's death. In 1993, he was succeeded as CEO by Jess Søderberg. He continued as chairman until December 2003, when he was 90, and Michael Pram Rasmussen took over. Mærsk Mc-Kinney Møller was, until his death, one of the "managing owners" of the company and was chairman of Odense Steel Shipyard until 2 May 2006.

A.P. Moller - Maersk announced its strategic choice to separate its oil and gas-related operations from the conglomerate structure and to concentrate only on container logistics in 2016. The majority shareholding in Maersk Tankers was sold to A.P. Moller Holding in 2017. Maersk Oil was sold to TOTAL S.A. in 2018, and Maersk Drilling became a separately listed company in April 2019.

In 2017, the company was one of the main victims of the NotPetya ransom malware attack, which severely disrupted its operation for several months.

In 2021, the company bought 8 carbon-neutral ships for £1bn.

In August 2021, Maersk joined the BEC Low-Carbon Charter.

In September 2023, Maersk unveiled Laura Mærsk, which uses methanol as a fuel. Laura Mærsk is a feeder vessel of 2,100 TEU capacity in service on the Baltic Sea. In June 2023, Maersk also announced an order for six additional mid-sized container vessels of 9,000 TEU capacity.

In November 2023, Maersk signed an agreement with Chinese developer Goldwind. The agreement looks to secure annual volumes of 500KT of fuels including bio-methanol and e-methanol produced utilising wind energy at a new production facility in Hinggan League, Northeast China, around 1000km northeast of Beijing. The first volumes are expected to arrive in 2026.

=== Maersk logo ===
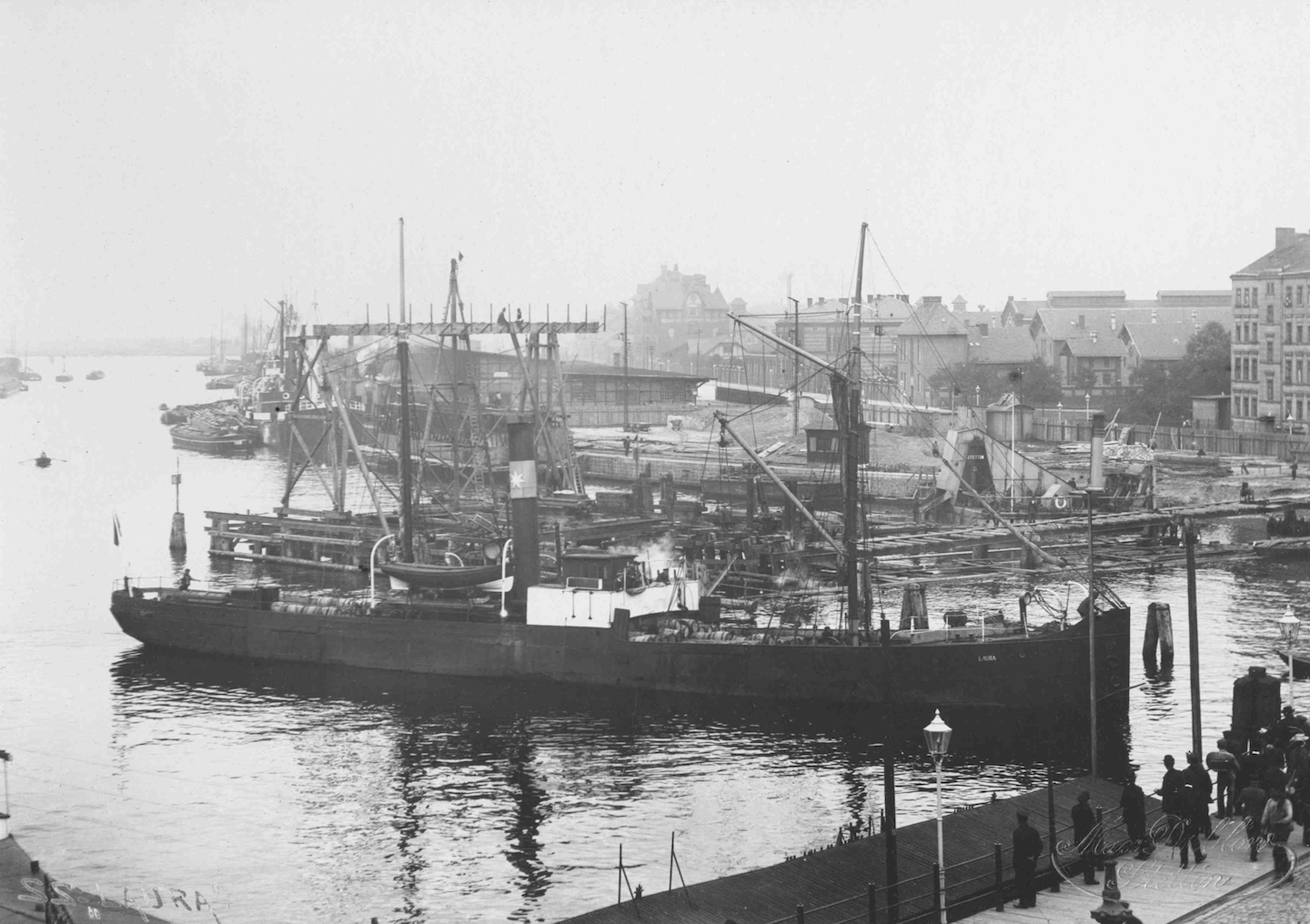
The SS Laura in 1886 in Svendborg, Denmark

The Maersk logo is a white, seven-pointed star on a pale blue background. The blue of the background came to be known as "Maersk blue", when it was trademarked by the company after the purchase of their first ship in 1886. According to a story recounted by Captain P. M. Møller's son Mærsk Mc-Kinney Møller, the logo dates back to 1886 when it was used on the captain's first steamer, SS Laura. The story relates an episode where Captain Møller's wife, Anna, had accompanied him on a sea voyage and fallen seriously ill.

In a letter dated 6 October 1886, he wrote to her: "The little star on the funnel is a reminder of the evening I prayed for you so dejectedly and anxiously, asking for the sign that I might see a star in the grey, overcast sky, a reminder that the Lord hears our prayers."

When The Steamship Company Svendborg was founded in 1904, the seven-pointed star on the pale blue background became its funnel emblem and the company's house flag symbol. When The Steamship Company of 1912 was established, the seven-pointed star was also chosen as their logo.

The white seven-pointed star has represented Maersk throughout the years, with only minor changes. The most recent changes date back to 1973 when Maersk enlisted the Danish designer and architect Acton Bjørn to establish a more modern design, which is still used today.

== Transport and logistics ==
=== Maersk ===
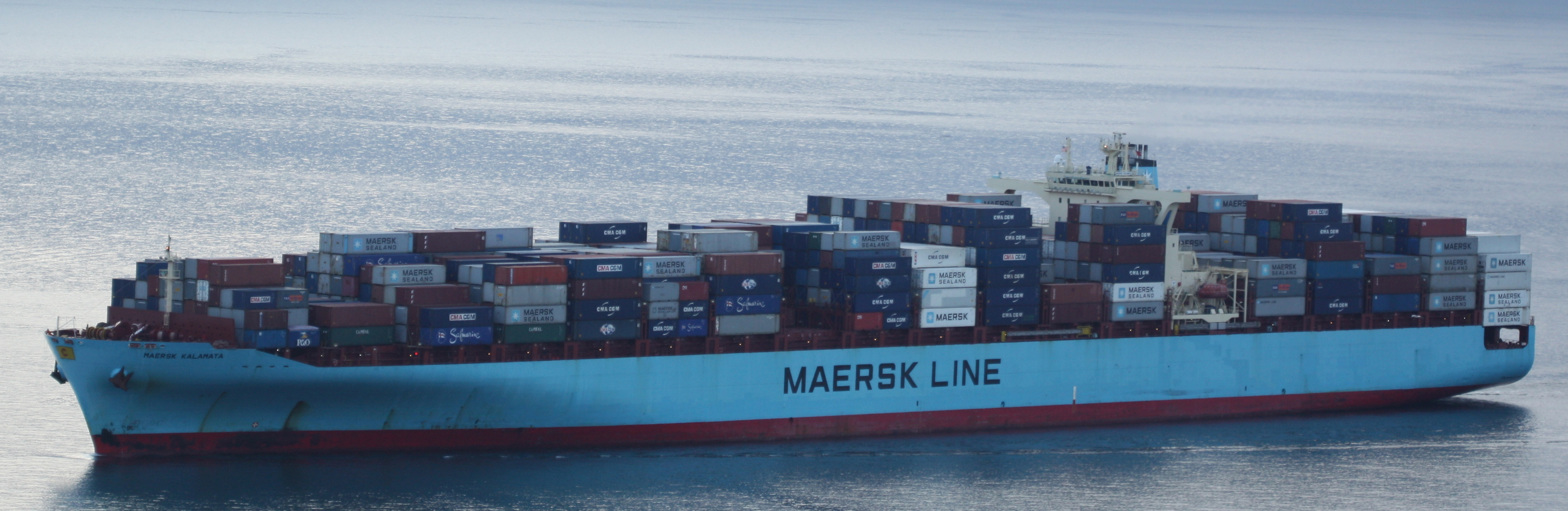
Mærsk Kalamata in Seattle harbor

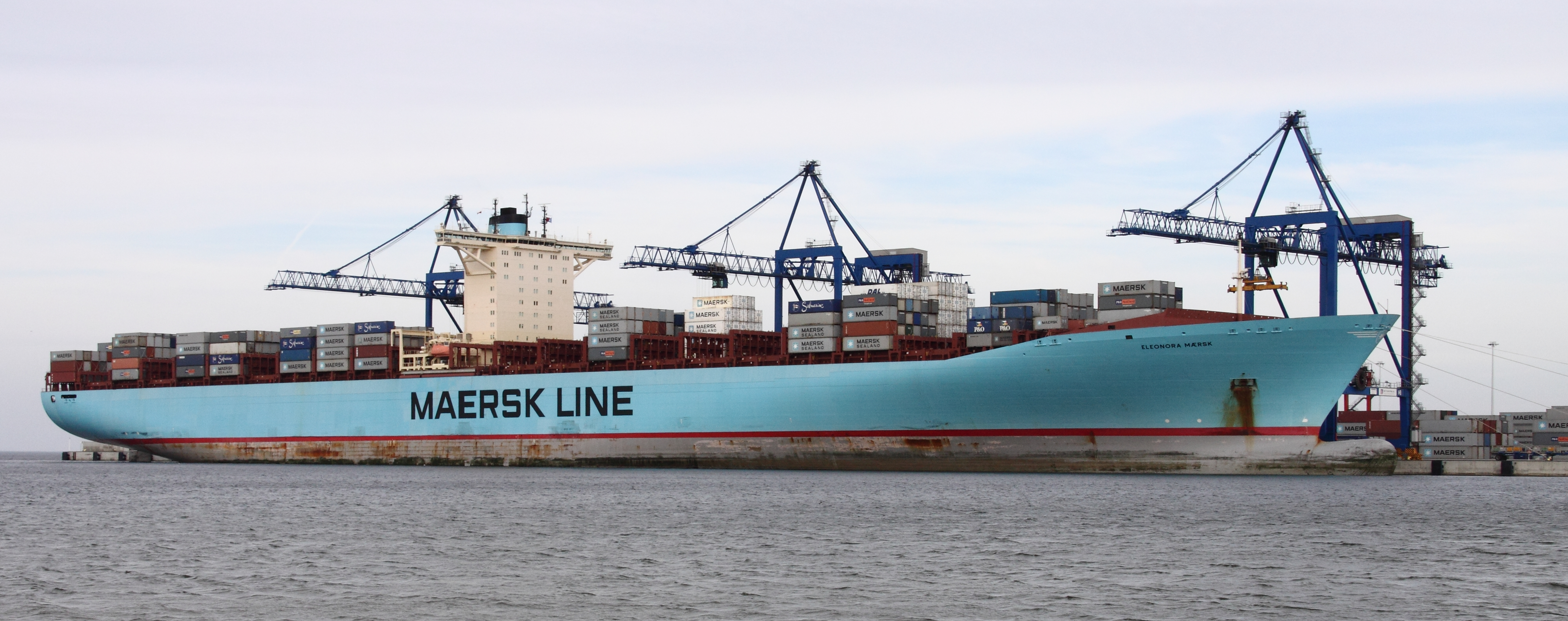
Eleonora Mærsk, one of the E-class vessels

The largest operating unit in A. P. Moller–Maersk by revenue and staff (around 25,000 employees in 2012) is Maersk Line. In 2013, the company described itself as the world's largest overseas cargo carrier and operated over 600 vessels with 3.8 million twenty-foot equivalent unit (TEU) container capacity. As of January 2021, as the largest container fleet, it held 17% of the global TEU.

In 2006, the largest container ship in the world to that date, the E-class vessel Emma Maersk, was delivered to Maersk Line from Odense Steel Shipyard. Since then, seven other sister ships have been built, and on 21 February 2011 Maersk ordered ten even larger container ships from Daewoo, the Triple E class, each with a capacity of 18,000 containers. The first was delivered in 2013. There was an option for 10–20 more, and in June 2011, Maersk placed a follow-on order for a second batch of ten sister ships (to the same design with the same shipyard), but cancelled its option for a third batch of ten.

As of February 2010, Maersk had an order book for new ships totaling 857000TEU (including options on the Triple E class); that backlog is larger than the existing fleet of the fourth-largest line, Evergreen Line.

Maersk Line cooperated with the United States Navy on testing 7–100% algae biofuel on the Maersk Kalmar in December 2011.

In January 2012, Søren Skou took over as CEO of Maersk Line from Eivind Kolding. Later that year, the company ceased its business in Iran in order to prevent potential damage to the company's business with Western countries, particularly the US, due to the sanctions regime led by those countries.

On 15 March 2022, Robert M. Uggla was appointed Chair of the Board at A.P. Moller – Maersk, succeeding Jim Hagemann Snabe. The appointment marks a generational change in the company. Robert M. Uggla represents the founding family and remains as CEO of A.P. Moller Holding.

On 12 December 2022, Vincent Clerc was appointed CEO of Maersk effective 1 January 2023.

=== APM Terminals ===
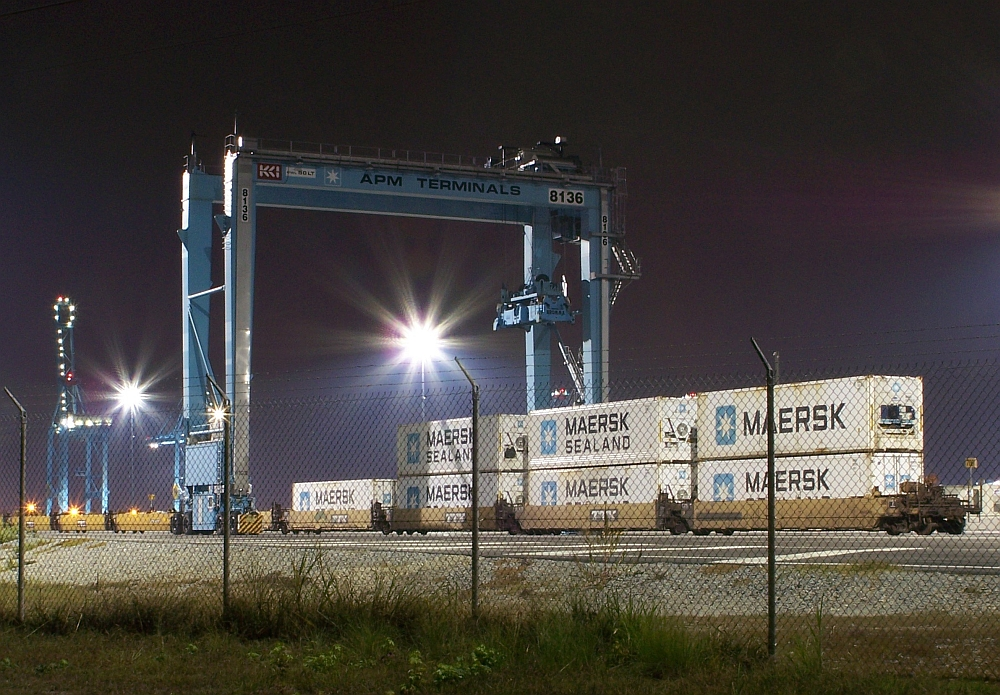
APM Terminals at Portsmouth, Virginia, United States

A. P. Moller–Maersk's independent APM Terminals business unit with its separate headquarters in The Hague, Netherlands, operates a Global Port, Terminal and Inland Services Network with interests in 57 ports and container terminals in 36 countries on five continents, as well as 155 Inland Services operations in 48 countries. Port and Terminal Operations include:

- New projects under construction: Savona, and Tema.
- Africa: Abidjan, Apapa, Cotonou, Douala, Luanda, Monrovia, Onne, Pointe Noire, Port Elizabeth, Tangier, and Tema.
- Europe: Algeciras, Aarhus, Barcelona, Bremerhaven, Gothenburg, Port of Poti, Rotterdam-Maasvlakte, Rotterdam-Maasvlakte 2, Wilhelmshaven-JadeWeserPort, Valencia, Gijón, Zeebrugge, Vado Ligure Reefer Terminal and Vado Gateway.
- North America: Los Angeles, Miami, Mobile, Port Elizabeth, and Tacoma.
- Latin America: Buenos Aires, Buenaventura (Colombia), Cartagena, Itajaí, Pecém, Callao, Santos, Lázaro Cárdenas, Puerto Quetzal, Yucatan, and Limon (Costa Rica).
- Middle East: Aqaba, Haifa, Bahrain, Salalah, Port Said and Jebel Ali.
- Asia: Cai Mep, Colombo, Dalian, Guangzhou, Kobe, Laem Chabang, Karachi, Pipavav, Qingdao, Tanjung Pelepas, Tianjin, Shanghai, Xiamen, Yokohama, India, and Singapore.

=== Maersk Container Industry ===
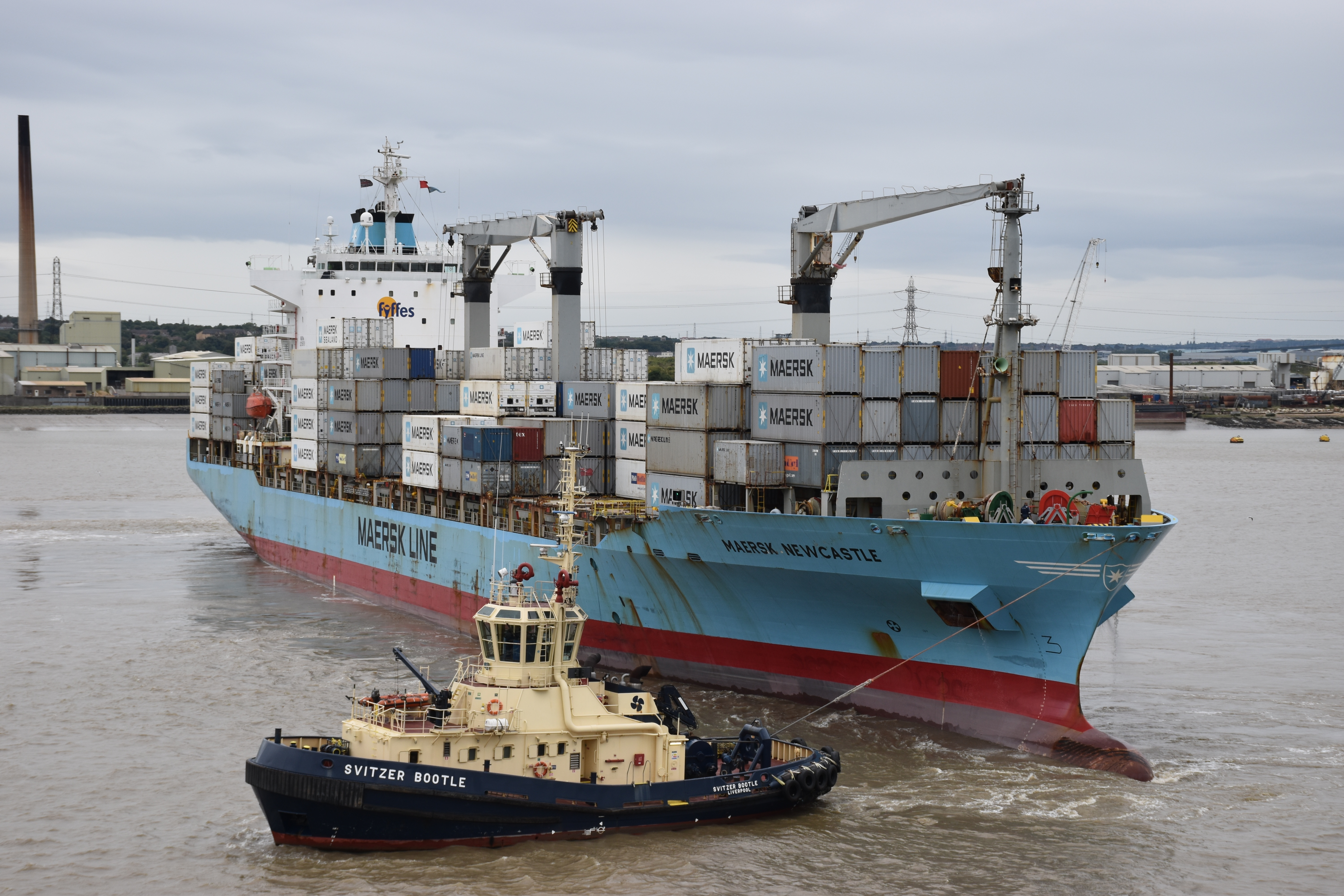
Svitzer Bootle assisting Mærsk Newcastle on the River Thames

Maersk Container Industry A/S: Container manufacturing with factories in China (Dongguan and Qingdao) and headquarters in Denmark (Tinglev).

Container Inland Services: Includes depots, equipment repair, trucking, container sales and related activity.

=== Svitzer ===
Svitzer was founded as a salvage client in 1833 before entering the towing business in 1870. Svitzer became majority owned by Maersk in 1979. Svitzer has continued to grow, including through purchasing the tugboat operations of Adsteam, and it now has a fleet of over 400 tugs, line handlers and other vessels. The company provides harbour and terminal towage services in over 100 ports and 20 oil and gas terminals across the globe. In January 2022, Svitzer operated a fleet of 110 vessels in seven ports and 11 terminals across 12 countries in Svitzer operates in the Africa, Middle East & Asia regions.

In February 2024, Maersk's Board of Directors demerged APMM's Svitzer's towage and marine services operations. APMM transferred shares of Svitzer A/S and its subsidiaries, along with related assets and liabilities, to a newly created entity named Svitzer Group A/S. The shares of Svitzer Group were subsequently listed on Nasdaq Copenhagen A/S.

The distribution of Svitzer Group shares to APMM shareholders was agreed at an exceptional general meeting. As a result, APMM's shareholders received shares in Svitzer Group in addition to their existing APMM holdings. Trading of Svitzer Group shares on Nasdaq Copenhagen began on 30 April 2024.

=== Damco ===
Damco was the combined brand of the Maersk Group's logistics activities, previously known as Maersk Logistics and Damco. As of 2008, Damco had 10,800 employees in offices in more than 93 countries. and was involved in supply chain management and freight forwarding all over the world. In September 2019, Maersk announced that they would dissolve the Damco brand and integrate their remaining activities after initially merging Maersk Line and Damco at the beginning of 2019, when the freight forwarding business of Damco stayed separate. The dissolving of the Damco brand was completed by the end of 2020.

== Business trends ==
In the 2025 financial year, Maersk generated revenue of US$53.9 billion. During the same financial year, 108,160 employees worked for the group.

Year	Revenue in million US$	Net income in million US$	Total assets in million US$	Employees
2015	30,769	791	62,408	
2016	27,646	(1,939)	61,118	
2017	31,189	(1,205)	63,227	
2018	39,257	2,985	62,690	
2019	38,890	(84)	55,399	80,000
2020	39,740	2,960	56,117	80,000
2021	61,787	18,170	72,271	95,000
2022	81,529	29,703	93,680	110,000
2023	51,065	3,954	82,578	100,000
2024	55,482	6,095	87,697	108,160

== Spun-off energy companies ==
=== Maersk Oil ===
Maersk Oil (Danish: Mærsk Olie og Gas A/S) was established in 1962 when Maersk was awarded a concession for oil and gas exploration and production in the Danish sector of the North Sea. Maersk Oil is engaged in exploring and producing oil and gas in many parts of the world. Total oil production is more than 600,000 barrels per day (95,000 m³/d) and gas production is up to some 1 billion cubic feet (28,000,000 m³) per day. Most of this production is from the North Sea, from both the Danish and British sectors, but there is also production in offshore Qatar, Algeria and Kazakhstan.

In addition to the above-mentioned producing sites, Maersk Oil is involved in exploration activities in Danish, British, Dutch and Norwegian sectors of the North Sea, Qatar, Algeria, Kazakhstan, Angola, Gulf of Mexico (US sector), Turkmenistan, Oman, Morocco, Brazil, Colombia and Suriname. Most of these activities are not 100% owned but are via membership in a consortium. The company developed production techniques for complex environments (The North Sea, etc.) and drilling techniques that extract oil from problematic underground conditions.

Oil and gas activities provided A .P. Moller–Maersk with 22% of its revenue and 68% of its profit in 2008. On 21 August 2017, A. P. Møller - Mærsk A/S announced the signing of an agreement to sell Mærsk Olie og Gas A/S to Total S.A. for US$7.45 billion in a combined share and debt transaction. The transaction was subject to regulatory and competition approval and was closed on 8 March 2018, when Maersk Oil became a part of Total.

=== Maersk Drilling ===
Maersk Drilling supports global oil and gas production by providing high-efficiency drilling services to oil companies worldwide. The company owns 24 rigs and its fleet consists of six Ultra-Harsh jack-ups, four XL Enhanced jack-ups (including one new build which is set for delivery in late 2016), four Harsh jack-ups, two Premium jack-up, four semi-submersibles and four Ultra deepwater drillships. Maersk Drilling is, among others, a market leader in the Norwegian jack-up market with a market share of 7 out of 12 rigs As of 2016. Maersk Drilling merged with Noble Corporation in 2022, the transaction was completed on 3 October.

=== Maersk Supply Service ===
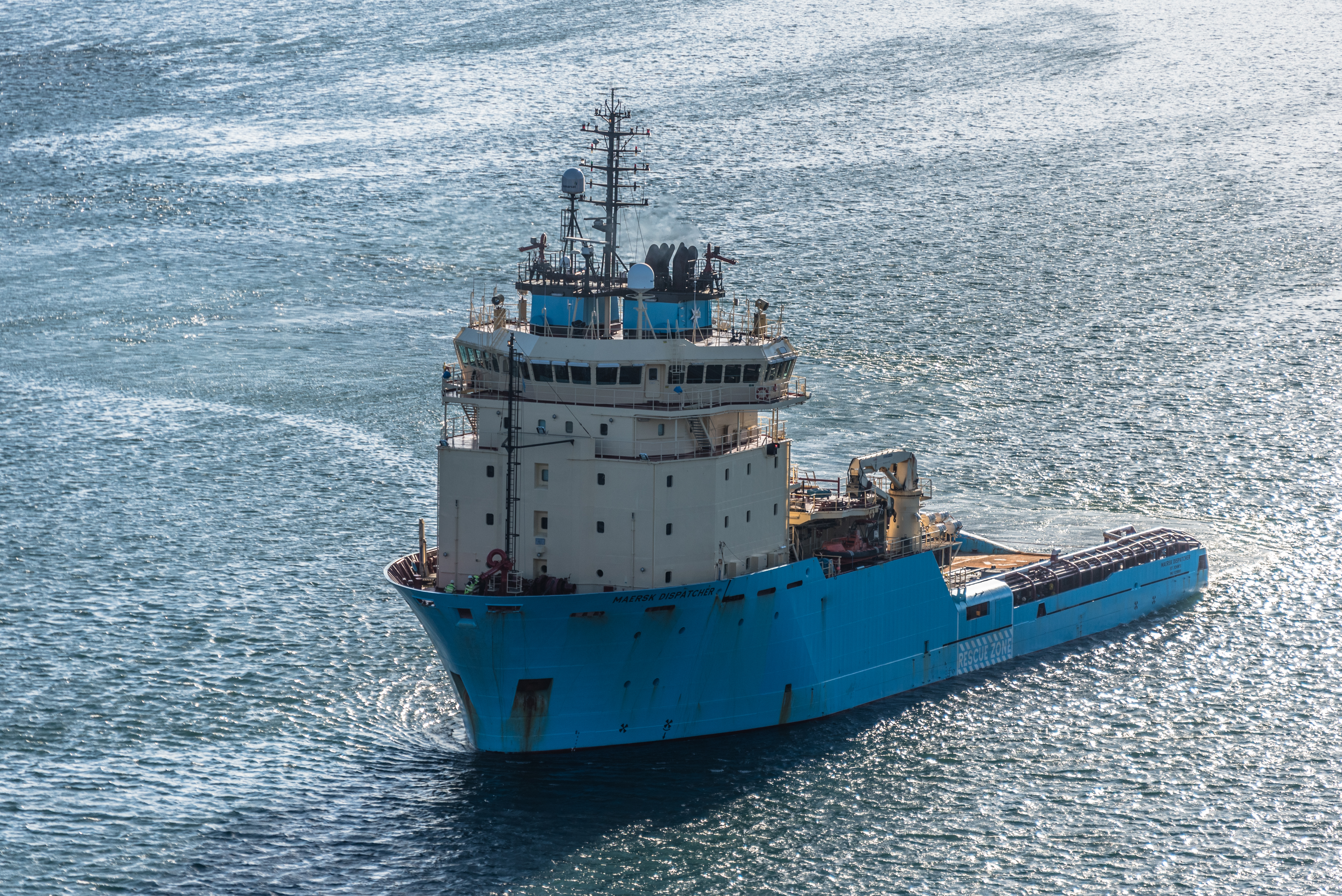
Offshore platform supply vessel (PSV AHTS), Maersk Dispatcher, entering the Narrows at St. John's Harbor, Newfoundland, Canada

Maersk Supply Service provides anchor handling, towage of drilling rigs and platforms, and supply service to the offshore industry. By 2021, the fleet consisted of 41 vessels, including anchor handling tug supply vessels (AHTS), subsea support vessels (SSV) and platform supply vessels (PSV).

In July 2024, it was announced that Norway's DOF Group would acquire Maersk Supply Service for approximately $1.1 billion to consolidate its offshore service sector further, focusing on the oil and gas sector.

== Maersk Integration ==
=== Maersk Line, Limited ===
Maersk Line, Limited (MLL) is a US-based subsidiary of A.P. Moller–Maersk Group, which owns and operates a fleet of US-flag vessels providing the U.S. Federal Government and their contractors with multimodal transportation and logistics services. A Virginia-based organization, MLL manages the world's largest fleet of internationally traded US-flagged vessels.

Maersk Line paid $31.9 million in fines to the U.S. in 2012, following a US Department of Justice investigation contending that Maersk had "knowingly overcharged the Department of Defense to transport thousands of containers from ports to inland delivery destinations in Iraq and Afghanistan" while under government contract to transport cargo via container ships in support of U.S. troops.

The Red Sea crisis had a significant impact on shipping, from November 2023 onward; in May 2024, Maersk estimated the impact as a capacity loss of 15–20 percent across the merchant shipping industry, based on its FY second quarter.

=== ex MCC transport ===
MCC Transport hosts containerized cargo services in the intra-Asia market. The company was later renamed Sealand-Asia.

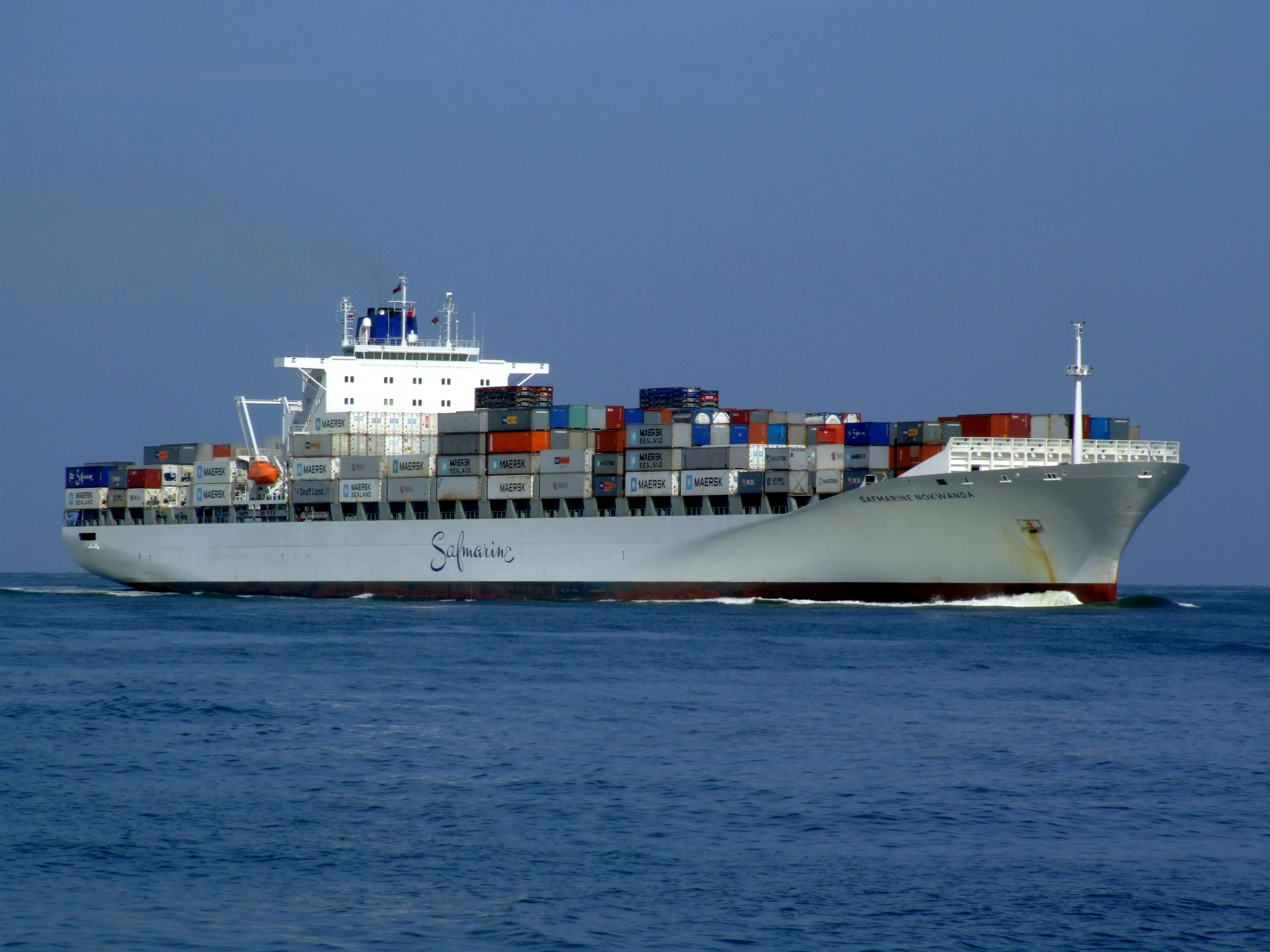
Safmarine Nokwanda

=== ex Seago Line ===
Seago Line is a subsidiary shipping line which serves ports in the Mediterranean region. The company is now Sealand- Europe and Mediterranean.

=== ex Safmarine ===
Safmarine is an independently operated shipping company in the A. P. Moller–Maersk Group with roots in Africa. It operates a fleet of over 40 container vessels and 20 multi-purpose vessels (MPVs). The company has five container vessels and four MPVs on order for delivery in 2009–2011. In September 2020, it was announced that the Safmarine brand would be integrated into Maersk.

=== ex Sealand ===
SeaLand, branded "Sealand – A Maersk Company", is an American regional maritime and logistics operator. It has been part of A. P. Moller - Maersk since 1999. The Sealand name was phased out in 2009, but revived as a separate brand in 2014. After focussing on intermodal services between North, Central and South America, in 2018 it was merged with other Maersk intra-regional brands MCC Transport and Seago Lines to cover European, Mediterranean, and Intra-Asian markets.

In 2023 it was decided to unify the Maersk brands and integrate the Sealand brand into Maersk. Over the course of 2023 all Sealand business was integrated with Maersk, and in December 2023 the Sealand brand ceased to exist.

=== Maersk Global Service Center ===
Maersk GSC operates shared service centres that handle back office and off-shore activities for AP Moller Maersk Group. GSCs are in Chennai, Mumbai, Pune, Bengaluru, Chengdu, and Metro Manila, with new GSCs to be opened in Mexico and Brazil to support Americas customers. In August of 2025, Maersk inaugurated a new shared service centre in Warsaw, Poland, to support its European customers.

=== Tankers, offshore and other shipping activities ===
Tankers, offshore and other shipping activities" accounted for 8.8% of Maersk's revenue in 2008 and posted 25% of the group's profit for this period. The business segment comprises Maersk Tankers (its technical management business sold to Synergy Marine Group in 2021), Maersk Supply Service, Maersk Drilling, Maersk FPSOs, Maersk LNG and Svitzer.

=== South American ex Aliança ===
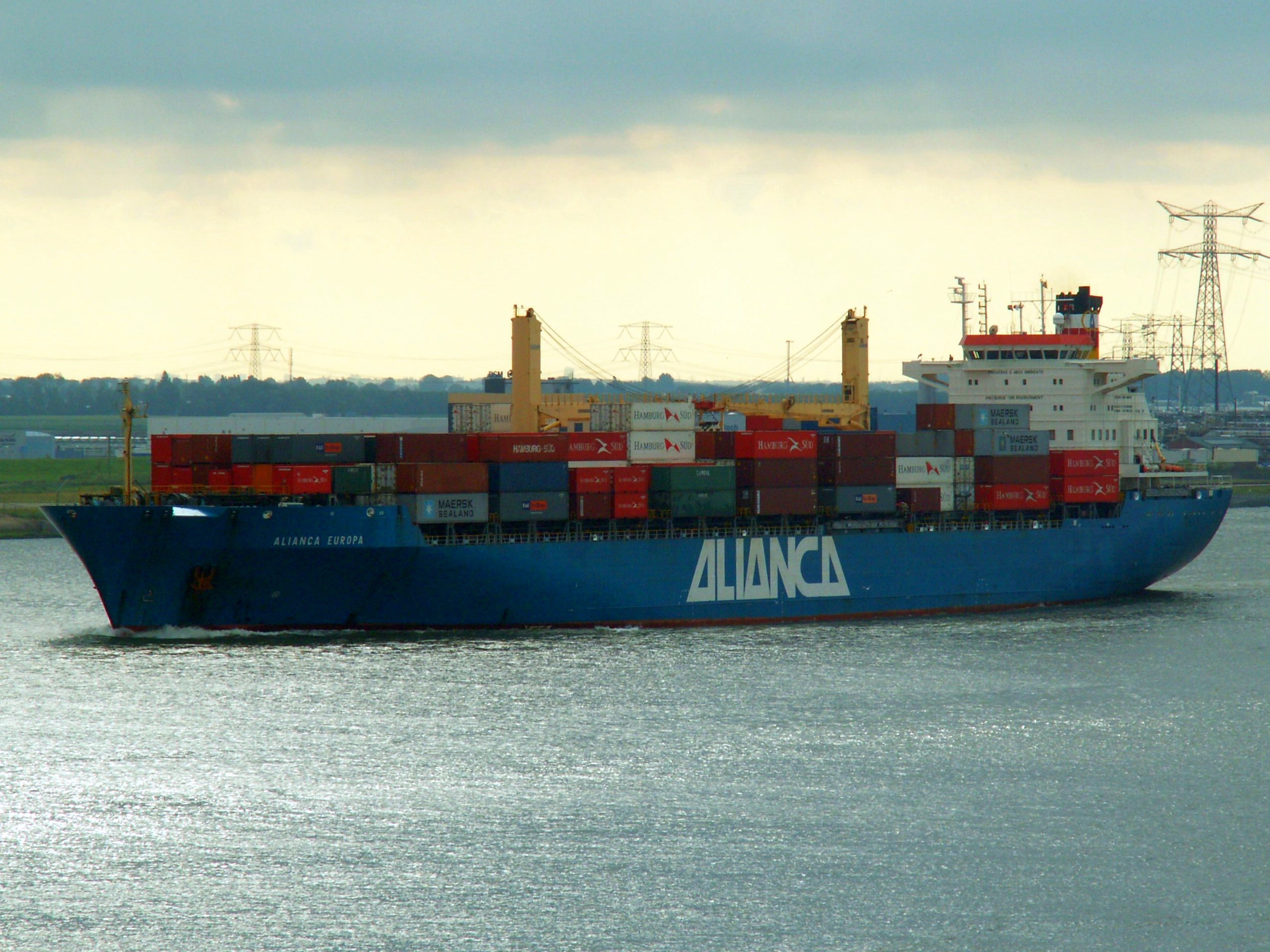
Aliança

Brazilian coaster container ship subsidiary with eight ships.

=== Gemini Cooperation ===
In January 2024, it was announced that Hapag-Lloyd, together with Maersk, would launch a long-term operational cooperation under the name Gemini Cooperation in February 2025. The new cooperation is expected to comprise around 340 ships with a combined capacity of 3.7 million standard containers (TEU); of these, Maersk is to provide 60% and Hapag-Lloyd 40%.

=== Ardent ===
Ardent Salvage, a joint-operating salvage company formed after the merger between Maersk-operated Svitzer and Crowley-operated TITAN Salvage, is involved in towage, salvage, wreck removal, marine firefighting and other offshore support and is represented in more than 100 ports worldwide. Ardent is based in Houston, Texas.

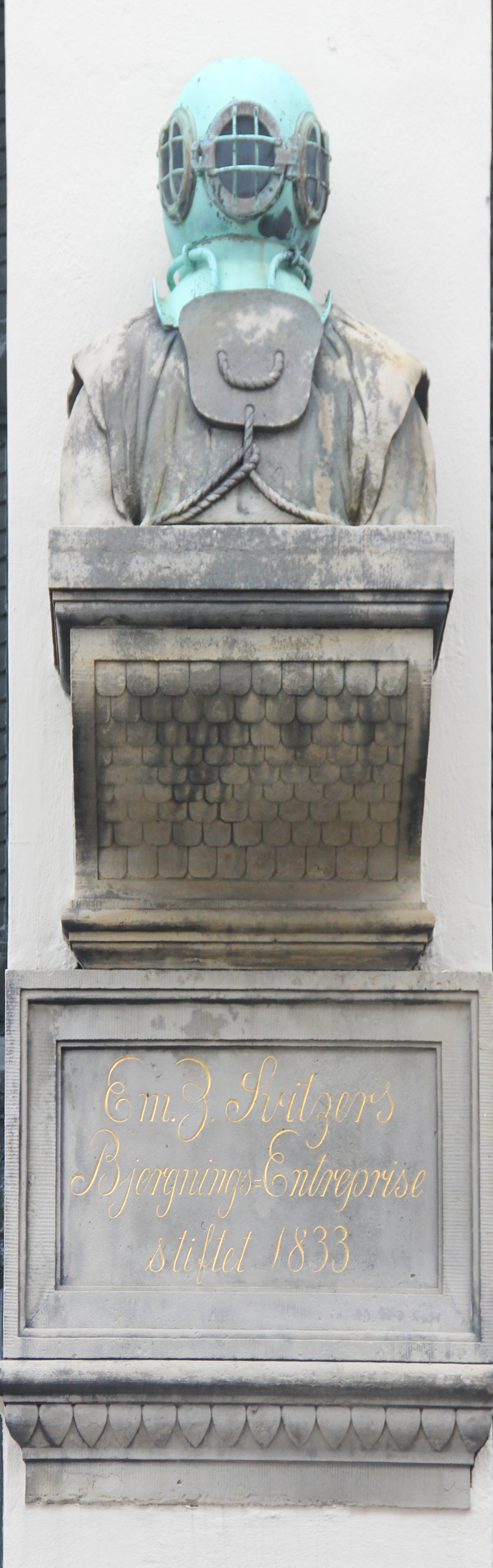
Bust in Copenhagen

=== KGH ===
Acquired in 2020, KGH is a European customs and trade solutions provider, including customs broker services and software application development. The KGH brand is now migrated into Maersk Customs Services.

=== Retail activity ===
The company formerly owned a stake in Dansk Supermarked Group which operates stores under the brands: Bilka (hypermarket), Føtex (supermarket, department store), Salling (department store) and Netto (discount supermarket).

=== Maersk Training ===
Maersk Training provides specialist training to specific industries. The 2010 merger of Maersk Training Centre and Svitzer Safety Services broadened a portfolio of courses to include the maritime, oil and gas terminals, and wind power industries.

With Headquarters in Svendborg, the MT Group global locations include Aberdeen and Newcastle in the UK, Esbjerg in Denmark, Stavanger in Norway, Rio de Janeiro in Brazil, Chennai & Mumbai in India, Kuala Lumpur in Malaysia. New centres include Houston, United States and Dubai, United Arab Emirates which is also the Middle Eastern hub.

In October 2023, Maersk Training bought the Norwegian company ResQ, a supplier of safety training and emergency preparedness.

=== Star Air ===
Star Air operated 11 leased Boeing 767 cargo aircraft, primarily engaged in long-term contract flying for United Parcel Service (UPS) in Europe. The Maersk corporate aircraft, a Gulfstream 450, was also operated by Star Air. In August 2022, Star Air became part of Maersk Air Cargo.

In 2023 Maersk announced the inaugural flight of a new air freight service with scheduled flights between Billund, Denmark (BLL) and Hangzhou, China (HGH) - the first scheduled air cargo operation between Denmark and Asia. The Eurasia operation began 20 March with three weekly flights on the first of three newly converted Boeing 767-300 freighters that were recently added to the fleet of Maersk Air Cargo.

In July 2024, Maersk took delivery of the first of two new Boeing 777F aircraft, which it will operate on its route from Billund to Hangzhou.

=== European Rail Shuttle B.V. ===
In August 2013, Freightliner Group announced the acquisition of a leading European intermodal rail operator and railway undertaking, ERS Railways B.V., from Maersk Line. ERS Railways B.V. is a railway transport company headquartered in Rotterdam that provides cargo transport, mostly ISO shipping containers.

=== World Robot Olympiad ===
World Robot Olympiad is a robotic competition headquartered in Singapore. Maersk Oil is currently a Gold sponsor of this event.

== Maersk and Danish climate targets ==
A.P. Møller-Maersk company accounts for over 80% of the Danish top 30 companies' emissions of carbon dioxide from operations. Mærsk has increased emissions by 2% since 2019, with a total of 37 million tonnes in 2021. The company presented plans to be CO_{2} neutral by 2040.

Since the Danish climate targets of a 70% CO_{2} reduction in 2030 are territorial based, emissions from foreign shipping and aviation from Danish ports and airports, and internationally, are not counted, as the responsibility lies with the UN's organizations for aviation (ICAO) and shipping (IMO). However, IMO has committed to halving the industry's greenhouse-gas emissions by 2050, and because 80% of global trade (around 11 billion tonnes) is transported by sea each year, global shipping generated about 1,000 million tonnes (3%) of carbon dioxide emissions in 2018. From territorial based point of view, the Maersk fleet is not obliged to make reductions, but instead pay through slightly higher taxes from the emissions to a fund based on taxes from the fleets use of bunker fuel, which will be able to compensate and finance climate measures, a concept developed by the Ministry of Climate and the Danish Maritime Authority.

In 2008, it was calculated by the DK Group that the Maersk fleet together released just over one million tonnes of sulfur dioxide SO_{2} per year from the fleets use of bunker fuel, and at the time until 2014, when China Shipping Lanes took over by one meter and 20 percent less fuel emissions, the world's largest container ship Emma Mærsk emits SO_{2} equivalent to 50 million cars.

"These are figures that are publicly available. But they have probably not really come to light because shipping has been totally unregulated. But when the biggest ships sail out, you have to imagine that 50 million cars will follow," says Jørn Winkler, founder of DK Group. For example, there are filters that remove virtually all sulfur dioxide and nitrogen, but the price of a filter for a large container ship is DKK 25 million. By comparison, Maersk uses approximately DKK 46 billion worth of fuel per year (expenses deducted as a cost in company tax calculations), and "In the past 20 years, it has been possible to remove the particles from the ships' exhaust fumes, but the will to do something is lacking," says Jørn Winkler in 2008.

The Danish Ministry of the Environment has in 2009 initiated an action plan, where the requirement is that SOx and NOx must be reduced using desulfurization plants, the so-called scrubbers, to build into the ships' chimney systems, where the smoke gets showered to benefit the air, but researchers at the Department of Aquatic Resources, DTU Aqua, find that this pollution, by a lot of heavy metals and tar substances, so-called polycyclic hydrocarbons (PAHs), are moved from the fuel into the sea instead, and thereby also poses a danger to the marine environment, as heavy metals do not break down and are taken up by plankton, from where they travel further up through the food chain - right up to fish. Environmentalist organizations however believe that the shipping companies have installed scrubbers on their ships so that they can continue to sail on cheap heavy bunker oil, which contains many environmentally harmful substances.

In 2023, Maersk became the first in the shipping industry to have its 2030 and 2040 targets validated by the Science Based Targets initiative (SBTi) in alignment with a 1.5°C and net zero pathway under SBTi's new maritime industry guidance. These new targets include specific sub-targets for scope 1, 2 and 3 emissions and will replace previous targets announced in early 2022.

=== Maersk and tonnage taxation ===
Denmark is the world's 11th largest flag state based on gross tonnage (the indication of a ship's size, ed.) in 2022, and the shipping companies account for approximately one-fifth of Denmark's total exports. According to the industry association Danish shipping, the latest figure for Danish-flagged ships is 779 ships with a total tonnage of 23.24 million gross registered tonnes, out of more than 50,000 merchant ships that trade internationally, under the flags of 150 nations.

Shipping companies in Denmark have a unique tax scheme – tonnage tax, which has been in force since 2001 to keep the shipping companies on Danish soil. Tonnage tax means that shipping companies pay a fixed tax or charge per ship, and the amount is thus not affected by the company's profit. With the tonnage tax, the shipping companies avoid the classic corporation tax of 22 per cent, which other companies must pay. On top of that, Maersk receives an unknown amount of state aid through the so-called DIS scheme, which allows the shipping company to pay tax-free salary to the crews, and thereby the tax saved then accrues to the shipping companies as state aid in the form of lower labor costs, which for the four years 2017–2020 are calculated at DKK 925, 925, 1,050 and 1,100 million respectively.

The tax scheme means that in 2021, Maersk should pay around 4% of a record-breaking earnings of about 16,08 billion USD (117.5 billion Danish kroner) before tax, but in reality paid 100.66 million US$ (697 million DKK) or 0.6 percent in tax to Denmark in 2021, according to the company's annual accounts, and much lower than the shipping company itself states in its published tax returns. The profit was expected to be DKK 270 billion in 2022, but ended to be 203 billion DKK in profit, and thought to pay the equivalent of three percent in tax (6.09 billion DDK), but in reality by Maersk tax statement for 2022, the tax payment in Denmark is calculated at 0.7 percent, but according to finance calculations, it suggests that the real share that ends up in the Danish treasury, will be less than 0.2 percent, according to Berlingske. But DKK 80 billion is calculated on its way to the shareholders of Maersk, where 45.23 percent is owned by 82,000 different shareholders in Denmark and abroad.

This compared to a deficit of DKK 3 billion in the company's accounts for the first half of 2009. – The first deficit in the group's history since World War II, with an expected deficit for the whole of 2009 of DKK 10.7 billion.

To keep this lucrative taxation scheme, compared to classic corporation tax, Maersk has met with the Ministry of Taxation and the Danish Maritime Authority and worked against a global minimum tax for the shipping industry with success, as their lobby meetings helped to exempt shipping from a global tax agreement, as a major deal on minimum tax was adopted by 135 countries under the OECD in 2021, which must ensure that international companies pay more in tax and minimum 15 percent, but precisely the shipping industry was exempted from the agreement. These meetings happened even though Maersk said publicly that they were open to paying more taxes if it happened through a global agreement. A strategy defended by the Social Democratic Minister for Taxation in 2023, 'Nothing abnormal' in that they have opposed global minimum tax.

To supply the Danish and international shipping companies, Denmark, even of its very small size of 43.094 km^{2} and a population of 5,932,654 in 2023, that by World Happiness Report in 2022 was voted as the world's second happiest population, and has been voted the world's happiest country several times due to coziness or "hygge", is also home country for several of the world's top 10 largest suppliers of bunker fuel and other ship and aircraft fuels, like the earlier OW Bunker, founded in 1980, was a marine fuel (bunker) company based at Nørresundby, near Aalborg in northern Denmark, that was the world's largest bunker supplier until its collapse on 7 November 2014. A lead now controlled by the Danish group Dan-Bunkering's owner company Bunker Holding, also known as Bunker Holding Group, and represented in 33 countries, is by 2022 the world's leading supplier and retailer of ship fuels, specializing since 1981 in the purchase, sale and delivery of fuel and lubricating oil for ships. On 14 December 2021, it was convicted for violation of EU sanctions against supplies to Syria, to protect the civilian population from attacks by bombers, when the Danish billion worth company, via agreements through its branch office in Kaliningrad in Russia with two Russian companies, Joint Stock Company Sovfracht and Maritime Assistance LLC, who were agents for the Russian Navy, and at several occasions from higher levels was informed of there violation, delivered jet fuel under cover of darkness, transshipped from one ship to another on the high seas, for use by the Russian military, a regular supplier for more than 30 years, to use in the petrol tanks of Russian fighter aircraft that have been air raid bombing Syria on behalf of Bashar al-Assad, with a fine of DKK 30 million for having sold 172,000 tonnes of jet fuel through 33 deals worth around DKK 648 million, and confiscation of the profit of around DKK 15 million and fined DKK four million, as well as a conditional discharge of four months in prison for the managing director of Bunker Holding, for having acted negligently, but not intentionally, as Dan-Bunkering's owner company Bunker Holding was found guilty of participating in eight of the transactions, it was fined DKK four million, a sentence not appealed against by Dan-Bunkering and Bunker Holding, "has the full confidence of the board and the owners", nor by the State Attorney for Special Economic and International Crime (SØIK), that didn't find reasons to appeal to increase the sentence, even a demand for two years' imprisonment and specified "the fuel has gone to Russian fighter jets, which on behalf of Assad have bombed Syria with the help of a total of 172,000 tons of jet fuel sold from the company headquarters in Middelfart via the two Russian companies in the period 2015 to 2017, and the EU introduced sanctions against Syria in 2014", expanded its lead as the world's largest bunker oil supplier in 2020, shows a report from the research house Seacred and the media Ship & Bunker, a location Bunker Holding, owned by United Shipping & Trading Company (USTC), has expanded from 2020, if measured in terms of volumes, which is particularly connected with Bunker Holding's purchase of Oceanconnect Marine, which is today merged with Bunker Holding's subsidiary KPI Bridge Oil. In addition, the subsidiary Bunker One is responsible for the physical delivery of marine fuel throughout the world, and is actively engaged in a number of green projects with, among other things, ammonia and methanol as ship fuel based on electricity from windmills (wind turbines) and PV solar cells.

== Piracy ==
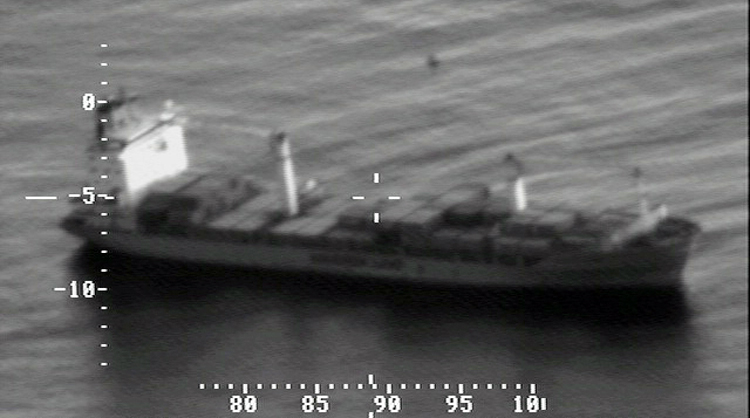
Maersk Alabama as seen from a P-3C Orion Aircraft during its 2009 hijacking.

On the morning of 8 April 2009, the 17,000-ton Maersk Alabama was en route to Mombasa, Kenya, when it was hijacked by pirates off the Somali coast. The company confirmed that the US-flagged vessel had 20 US nationals on board. This was the first time that the US had to deal with a situation in which Americans were aboard a ship seized by pirates in over 200 years. By noon, the Americans could resist the pirates and regain control of the boat. However, the pirates retreated on a covered lifeboat and held the captain hostage for four days. On 12 April 2009, it was confirmed that the captain held hostage was freed by the US Navy, whose SEAL sharpshooters killed three of the pirates. A fourth pirate surrendered earlier due to a medical injury. These events were subsequently dramatized in the 2013 film Captain Phillips, directed by Paul Greengrass, starring Tom Hanks in the titular role. Some crew members were involved in the development of the film as well.

Maersk Line estimated that piracy costs the company $100 million per year due to longer routes and higher speed, particularly near East Africa.

As of 2010, all 83 Maersk tankers were diverting around the Cape of Good Hope south of Africa instead of going through the Suez Canal, although Mærsk Mc-Kinney Møller, the first of the Triple E-class vessels, successfully navigated the Suez during her maiden voyage. Frequent attacks by Houthi rebels in the Suez Canal during the 2020s also kept Maersk vessels from shipping through the Red Sea, only returning in January 2026, with successive successful trans-Suez crossings by Maersk Sebarok and Maersk Denver.

== Criticism ==
=== Labor practices in El Salvador and China ===
Trade unions and labor rights organizations have criticized Maersk's labor practices in different parts of the world.

In El Salvador, Maersk has been accused of maintaining abusive conditions for port drivers. Charges include excessively long shifts, minimal wages and the repression of freedom of association by running union-busting campaigns, including firing and blacklisting at least 100 drivers in 2001.

Globalization Monitor, a labor rights group based in Hong Kong, has reported poor labor conditions in Maersk facilities in Dongguan and Qingdao, China. In January and May 2008, two riots reportedly broke out amongst workers at the Maersk plant in Dongguan in protest of poor working conditions and employment terms. In April 2011, Globalization Monitor stated, "Maersk's plants in China are still far from satisfactory as long as labor and human rights are concerned."

=== Overcharging allegations of US Government in Iraq and Afghanistan ===
In response to a complaint from whistleblower Jerry H. Brown II, the US Government filed suit against Maersk for overcharging for shipments to US forces fighting in Iraq and Afghanistan. In a settlement announced on 3 January 2012, the company agreed to pay $31.9 million in fines and interest but made no admission of wrongdoing. Brown was entitled to $3.6 million of the settlement.

=== Violation of embargo on Sudan ===
In August 2010, the US government fined Maersk $3.1 million for violating its embargo on Sudan. "Maersk had a waiver from the US government to deliver US Food Aid into Sudan, so the US-flagged ship was in Port Sudan to deliver humanitarian aid," a U.S. government spokesman said, but "the booking systems did not identify cargo that was coming on and off the ship, and that could be of violation of the embargo". The US government imposed a trade embargo on Sudan in 1997 due to human rights violations linked to the civil war between the north and south of the African country and also because of the regime's alleged support of international terrorist groups.

=== Business with Iran ===
In July 2010, Maersk had ties to an Iranian company that was blacklisted by the EU, Tidewater Middle East Co. The firm suspended operations at several Iranian ports owned by Tidewater Middle East Co after being pressured by the United States government. Maersk operates in other Bangladeshi ports and also diverted shipments to Dubai, partnering with other Bangladeshi companies that are not bound by U.S. sanctions.

On 28 April 2015, the Marshall Islands-flagged container ship Maersk Tigris, which was not owned by Maersk, was travelling westbound through the Strait of Hormuz. Iranian Revolutionary Guard naval patrol boats contacted the ship and directed it to proceed into Iranian territorial waters, according to a spokesman for the US Defense Department. When the ship's master declined, one of the Iranian craft fired shots across the bridge of Maersk Tigris. The master complied and proceeded into Iranian waters near Larak Island. The US Navy sent aircraft and a destroyer, USS Farragut, to monitor the situation.

Maersk stated they have agreed to pay an Iranian company $163,000 over a dispute about ten container boxes transported to Dubai in 2005. The court ruling allegedly ordered a fine of $3.6 million.

=== Regulation violations and contract fraud ===
In October 2010, Maersk pleaded guilty to 8 counts of failing to provide adequate hours of rest and 1 count of failing to improve the situation.

In February 2014, Maersk paid 8.7 million to settle allegations that they had forged documents on a contract to ship cargo to Afghanistan. The government says they uncovered 277 instances "in which claims verifying receipt of shipments in Afghanistan contained forged signatures." The settlement included no admission of guilt.

=== Sexual harassment suspensions and lawsuits ===
In May 2021, a Maersk officer's license was suspended after he was accused of sexual assault, including abusive, unwanted, and inappropriate touching in violation of Maersk's anti-harassment policy. On 12 October 2021, Maersk suspended five employees for their involvement in the rape of a 19-year-old girl.

In June 2022, Hope Hicks, formerly known as "Midshipman X" filed a lawsuit against Maersk, alleging that the company failed to protect her from rampant sexual abuse. In the same month, a second US Merchant Marine Academy (USMMA) student under the alias "Midshipman Y" filed a suit against Maersk, also alleging that the company did not protect her from sexual abuse and violence.

=== Pollution from fuels ===
In 2009, it was estimated that the Maersk fleet's use of bunker fuel released sulphur dioxide and nitrogen oxides, into the atmosphere corresponding to the emissions from 9 billion cars, with resultant serious health, environmental, and climate change impacts related.

Health problems linked to nitrogen oxides are linked back to a study in 2023 that found nitrogen oxides to be a major contributor to the bone deterioration in postmenopausal women. The study included a cohort of 161,808 postmenopausal women, with approximately one in two of involved women experiencing a bone fracture or damage to the lumbar spine as a result of exposure to the emissions.

For example, lumbar spine bone mineral density (BMD) decreased 0.026 g/cm^{2}/year per a 10% increase in 3-year mean NO_{2} concentration, or the amount to 1.22% annual reductions, nearly double the annual effects of age on any of the anatomical sites evaluated.

Ivan Seistrup, group vice-president in A.P. Møller Mærsk, stated in 2009: "Among other things, we have entered into close cooperation with Boeing on the development of biofuel for the shipping industry, which will constitute a technological quantum leap. One solution could be to sail on clean biofuel in coastal areas, and then use bunker fuel in the open sea, where it does no harm."

The two most common types of biofuel are bioethanol and biodiesel. However, scientists and research of Norwegian Vestlandsforskning have found that biodiesel can increase the risk of cancer, caused by two molecules called polycyclic aromatic hydrocarbon (PAH), which is formed from fossil diesel, and fatty acid methyl esters (FAME), formed from biodiesel, and also show an ecotoxicological profile of both urban and rural air pollution.

=== Contravention of Maritime Organisation's SOLAS Convention and cloaking ===
In August 2024, the South African Government was alerted to two Maersk chartered ships (Campton and Candor) carrying approximately 816 total metric tonnes on board the two ships in 100 short containers of toxic steel furnace dust collected from pollution control filters. The containers were collected from Albania to be delivered to Thailand, passing around the south of Africa on route. The containers in question that potentially could contain mis-declared/hazardous waste cargo were picked up by Maersk (on behalf of MSC) in Trieste and were to be unloaded in Singapore.

The Basel Action Network (BAN) alerted the South African government to the fact that the Automatic Identification System (AIS) GPS beacon of the Maersk Campton was switched off on 31 July 2024 in contravention of the Maritime Organisation's SOLAS Convention and failed to make its scheduled docking in Cape Town. The practice, known as cloaking, can be used for illegitimate purposes, e.g. to hide the location of a ship in cases where illegal dumping of waste takes place. Cloaking however is also used for legitimate reasons such as security concerns, e.g. to protect vessels in transit near the Red Sea from being targeted by terrorist groups. The containers are currently being repatriated from Singapore to Albania by MSC on their ship Maria Saveria.

=== Business with Israel ===
Since 2024, Maersk has faced criticism and pressure from an international campaign by the Palestinian Youth Movement and its allies to end its role in transporting military cargo and goods to Israel, including to Israeli settlements in the occupied Palestinian territories. In November 2024, Maersk container ship Denver was denied entry to the Spanish port of Algeciras, due to allegations that the ship was carrying arms supplies to Israel.

On 24 February 2025, Maersk's headquarters in Copenhagen was the target of a mass protest action by activists over the transportation of U.S. government military equipment in relation to the Gaza war. Police cleared the protestors using batons and tear gas after they refused to leave after repeated requests, resulting in the arrest of 22 people. Greta Thunberg was among those arrested.

On 25 April 2025, dockworkers in Tangier, Morocco refused to load F-35 parts onto a Maersk ship bound for Israel, following days of protests that attracted about 1,500 people. In June, a statement on the Maersk website said, "Following a recent review of transports related to the West Bank, we further strengthened our screening procedures in relation to Israeli settlements, including aligning our screening process with the OHCHR database of enterprises involved in activities in the settlements." Maersk became the first logistics company to divest from the transportation of settlement goods, but continues to ship military cargo, including F-35 parts, to the Israeli Ministry of Defense as of 10 July 2025.

== NotPetya malware attack ==
On 27 June 2017, Maersk IT systems were the victim of a malware attack utilizing NotPetya, which was designed to appear to be a ransomware attack. The cyberattack was perpetrated by the Russian military cyberorganization, the GRU, and designed to attack Ukraine, but in fact almost destroyed Maersk Shipping. Wired magazine described it as the "most devastating cyberattack in history." In March 2020 Maersk revealed they would be terminating the employment and outsourcing the work of the UK based IT team that helped them successfully fend off and recover from the ransomware attack that shut down operations, as Maersk was forced to rebuild its IT infrastructure in 10 days and sustained losses of more than US$300 million to put on its tax relief as expenses.

== See also ==
- Top container shipping companies
- List of petroleum companies
- List of ships owned by Maersk
- Mask Off Maersk
