= Peter Mærsk Møller =

Danish sea captain (1836–1927)

- Born: 22 September 1836; Rømø, Denmark
- Died: 9 February 1927 (aged 90); Svendborg, Fyn, Denmark

Peter Mærsk Møller (/mɛərsk ˈmuːlər/ mairsk MOO-lər; 22 September 1836 – 9 February 1927) was a Danish sea captain and the father of Arnold Peter Møller, founder of the Maersk corporation, and grandfather of Mærsk Mc-Kinney Møller, who made Maersk the largest container ship operator and supply vessel operator in the world. Next in line to inherit the company is Martin Mærsk Møller.

In 1864, Peter Mærsk Møller married shipowner Hans Nielsen Jeppesen’s daughter Anna, and the couple had ten children.

== Career ==
He passed his merchant officer's examination at Flensborg Navigation School and became a captain in 1861. His first assignment was the ship Prima in 1862.

After the Second Schleswig War in 1864, Peter Mærsk Møller's birthplace Rømø, as Flensborg, passed under Prussian rule (and from 1871 was German territory; Rømø remained so until 1920, and Flensborg – now Flensburg – still is a German city), so Captain Mærsk Møller moved to Dragør, only a few kilometres to the east of Copenhagen. He was the first in Denmark to suggest steam ships instead of sailing ships. He did so in 1884, as he moved from Dragør to Svendborg, on the island of Fyn.

In 1904, Peter Mærsk Møller, with the fifth of his nine sons, Arnold Peter Møller, founded Dampskibsselskabet Svendborg i 1904 ("The Steam Ship Company of Svendborg 1904"). Eight years later, the success of this enterprise encouraged A.P. Møller to start his own: Dampskibsselskabet af 1912, which eventually became the Maersk business conglomerate.
