= Arnold Peter Møller =

Danish businessman (1876–1965)

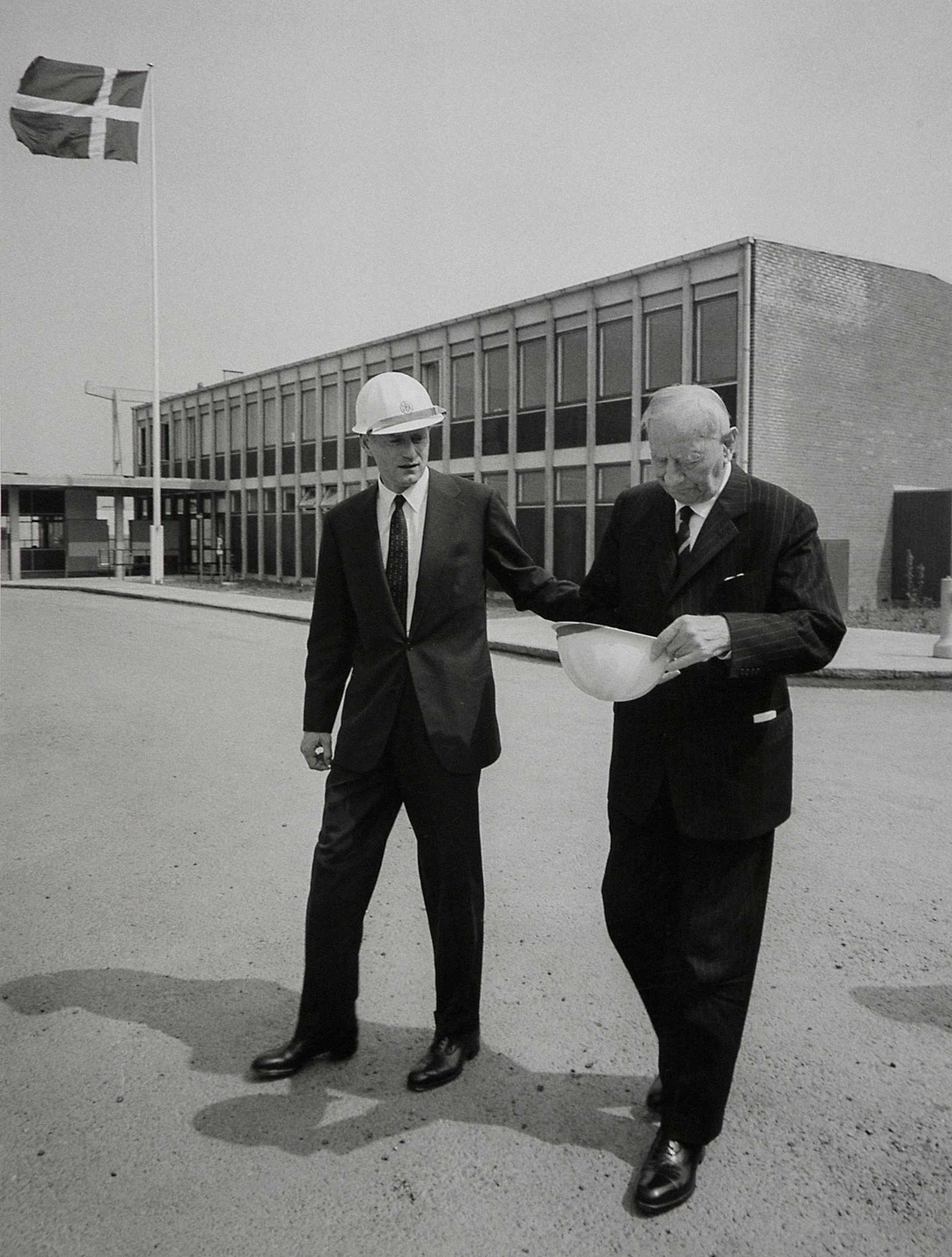
- A.P. Møller with his son Mærsk Mc-Kinney Møller (left) in Denmark, 1962.
- Born: 2 October 1876; Dragør, Denmark
- Died: 12 June 1965 (aged 88); Copenhagen, Denmark
- Occupation: Shipping
- Parent: Peter Mærsk Møller (father)

Arnold Peter Møller (2 October 1876 – 12 June 1965), better known as A. P. Møller, was a Danish shipping magnate and businessman who was the founder of the A.P. Moller-Maersk Group in 1904.

== Biography ==
A. P. Møller was the son of captain Peter Mærsk Møller and Anna Hans Jeppesen. His mother came from a well-known shipping dynasty in Dragør and his maternal grandfather Hans Nielsen Jeppesen was known as "the King of Dragør". The Møller family moved to Svendborg on Funen after having lost a power struggle against Anna's sisters and their husbands.

In 1904, A. P. Møller and his father founded Dampskibsselskabet Svendborg (Steamship Company Svendborg) with a capital of DKK 150,000, to take advantage of business opportunities created by the introduction of steam ships. A. P. Møller went on to found Dampskibsselskabet af 1912 (Steamship Company of 1912) to be free to operate his business as he chose. The two companies were merged as A.P. Møller-Mærsk in 2003. A. P. Møller married American Chastine Mc-Kinney, with whom he had two sons, Arnold and Hans, and two daughters, Jane and Sally. Arnold, also known under his middle names as Mærsk Mc-Kinney Møller, would become the long-term successor to A. P. Møller.

The First World War was a very lucrative period for the shipping business, and A. P. Møller managed to take full advantage of the opportunities. After the war, his company was the fourth biggest shipping company in Denmark. The company grew steadily in the interwar years and was the biggest in Denmark at the outbreak of the Second World War. Before the German invasion of Denmark in April 1940, A.P. Møller telegraphed his ships not to obey orders from occupied Denmark. During the occupation of Denmark from 1940 to 1945, Mærsk Mc-Kinney Møller ran a substantial part of the company from the United States. But the family lost a great deal of money because the US government would not pay full compensation for the use of their ships during the war.

A. P. Møller was also involved in business ventures outside the shipping industry. He secured a contract on drilling oil in the Danish part of the North Sea in 1962. In 1964, Møller joined merchant Herman Salling in a 50–50 ownership of the retail chain Dansk Supermarked. This chain went on to become the biggest retail company in Denmark. On A.P. Møller's death in 1965, his son Arnold Mærsk Mc-Kinney Møller succeeded him as chairman and CEO of the A.P. Moller-Maersk Group.
