= List of ships owned by Maersk =

This is a list of ships owned or operated by Danish shipping company Maersk

== Active ships ==
The following lists are active ships of the Maersk fleet as of December 2022.

=== Container ships ===
Class	Ship	Capacity (TEU)	Entered service	Displacement	Length (metres)	Note
Triple E class (first generation)	Mærsk Mc-Kinney Møller	18,270 TEU	2013	263,823 tonnes	399 metres	
Triple E class (first generation)	Majestic Mærsk	18,270 TEU	2013	263,823 tonnes	399 metres	
Triple E class (first generation)	Mary Mærsk	18,270 TEU	2013	263,823 tonnes	399 metres	
Triple E class (first generation)	Marie Mærsk	18,270 TEU	2013	263,823 tonnes	399 metres	
Triple E class (first generation)	Madison Mærsk	18,270 TEU	2014	263,823 tonnes	399 metres	
Triple E class (first generation)	Magleby Mærsk	18,270 TEU	2014	263,823 tonnes	399 metres	
Triple E class (first generation)	Maribo Mærsk	18,270 TEU	2014	263,823 tonnes	399 metres	
Triple E class (first generation)	Marstal Mærsk	18,270 TEU	2014	263,823 tonnes	399 metres	
Triple E class (first generation)	Matz Mærsk	18,270 TEU	2014	263,823 tonnes	399 metres	
Triple E class (first generation)	Mayview Mærsk	18,270 TEU	2014	263,823 tonnes	399 metres	
Triple E class (first generation)	Merete Mærsk	18,270 TEU	2014	263,823 tonnes	399 metres	
Triple E class (first generation)	Majestic Maersk	18,270 TEU	2014	263,823 tonnes	399 metres	
Triple E class (first generation)	Mogens Mærsk	18,270 TEU	2014	263,823 tonnes	399 metres	
Triple E class (first generation)	Morten Mærsk	18,270 TEU	2014	263,823 tonnes	399 metres	
Triple E class (first generation)	Munkebo Mærsk	18,270 TEU	2014	263,823 tonnes	399 metres	
Triple E class (first generation)	Maren Mærsk	18,270 TEU	2014	263,823 tonnes	399 metres	
Triple E class (first generation)	Margrethe Mærsk	18,270 TEU	2015	263,823 tonnes	399 metres	
Triple E class (first generation)	Marchen Mærsk	18,270 TEU	2015	263,823 tonnes	399 metres	
Triple E class (first generation)	Mette Mærsk	18,270 TEU	2015	263,823 tonnes	399 metres	
Triple E class (first generation)	Marit Mærsk	18,270 TEU	2015	263,823 tonnes	399 metres	
Triple E class (first generation)	Mathilde Mærsk	18,270 TEU	2015	263,823 tonnes	399 metres	
Triple E class (second generation)	Madrid Mærsk	18,270 TEU	2017	277,814 tonnes	399 metres	
Triple E class (second generation)	Munich Mærsk	18,270 TEU	2017	277,814 tonnes	399 metres	
Triple E class (second generation)	Moscow Mærsk	18,270 TEU	2017	277,814 tonnes	399 metres	
Triple E class (second generation)	Milan Mærsk	18,270 TEU	2017	277,814 tonnes	399 metres	
Triple E class (second generation)	Monaco Mærsk	18,270 TEU	2017	277,814 tonnes	399 metres	
Triple E class (second generation)	Marseille Mærsk	18,270 TEU	2018	277,814 tonnes	399 metres	
Triple E class (second generation)	Manchester Mærsk	18,270 TEU	2018	277,814 tonnes	399 metres	
Triple E class (second generation)	Murcia Mærsk	18,270 TEU	2018	277,814 tonnes	399 metres	
Triple E class (second generation)	Manila Mærsk	18,270 TEU	2018	277,814 tonnes	399 metres	
Triple E class (second generation)	Mumbai Mærsk	18,270 TEU	2018	277,814 tonnes	399 metres	
Triple E class (second generation)	Maastricht Mærsk	18,270 TEU	2018	277,814 tonnes	399 metres	
E class	Emma Mærsk	14,770 TEU	2006	263,823 tonnes	397.7 metres	
E class	Estelle Mærsk	14,770 TEU	2006	263,823 tonnes	397.7 metres	
E class	Eleonora Mærsk	14,770 TEU	2007	263,823 tonnes	397.7 metres	
E class	Evelyn Mærsk	14,770 TEU	2007	263,823 tonnes	397.7 metres	
E class	Ebba Mærsk	14,770 TEU	2007	263,823 tonnes	397.7 metres	
E class	Elly Mærsk	14,770 TEU	2007	263,823 tonnes	397.7 metres	
E class	Edith Mærsk	14,770 TEU	2007	263,823 tonnes	397.7 metres	
E class	Eugen Mærsk	14,770 TEU	2008	263,823 tonnes	397.7 metres	
Edinburgh class	Maersk Edinburgh	13,092 TEU	2010	184,720 tonnes	366.46 metres	
Edinburgh class	Maersk Emden	13,092 TEU	2010	184,720 tonnes	366.46 metres	
Edinburgh class	Maersk Eindhoven	13,092 TEU	2010	184,720 tonnes	366.46 metres	
Edinburgh class	Maersk Essen	13,092 TEU	2010	184,720 tonnes	366.46 metres	
Edinburgh class	Maersk Edmonton	13,092 TEU	2011	184,720 tonnes	366.46 metres	
Edinburgh class	Maersk Elba	13,092 TEU	2011	184,720 tonnes	366.46 metres	
Edinburgh class	Maersk Evora	13,092 TEU	2011	184,720 tonnes	366.46 metres	
Edinburgh class	Maersk Essex	13,092 TEU	2011	184,720 tonnes	366.46 metres	

=== Chemical/product tankers ===
Class	Ship	Image	Capacity (GT)	Entered service	Displacement	Length (metres)	Note
Handysize tanker	Helene Maersk		25,722 GT	2010	39,312 tonnes	180 metres	
Handysize tanker	Henning Maersk		25,710 GT	2010	47,330 tonnes	180 metres	
Tanker	Maersk Phoenix		61,724 GT	2005		244 metres	
Tanker	Mærsk Pearl		2005				
Tanker	Mærsk Pelican		2008				Sold, January 2021
Tanker	Mærsk Penguin		2007				
Tanker	Mærsk Princess		2005				
Tanker	Mærsk Producer		2006				
Tanker	Mærsk Progress		2005				
Tanker	Mærsk Promise		2006				
Tanker	Mærsk Prosper		2001				
