= Port of Gdańsk =

Seaport in Poland

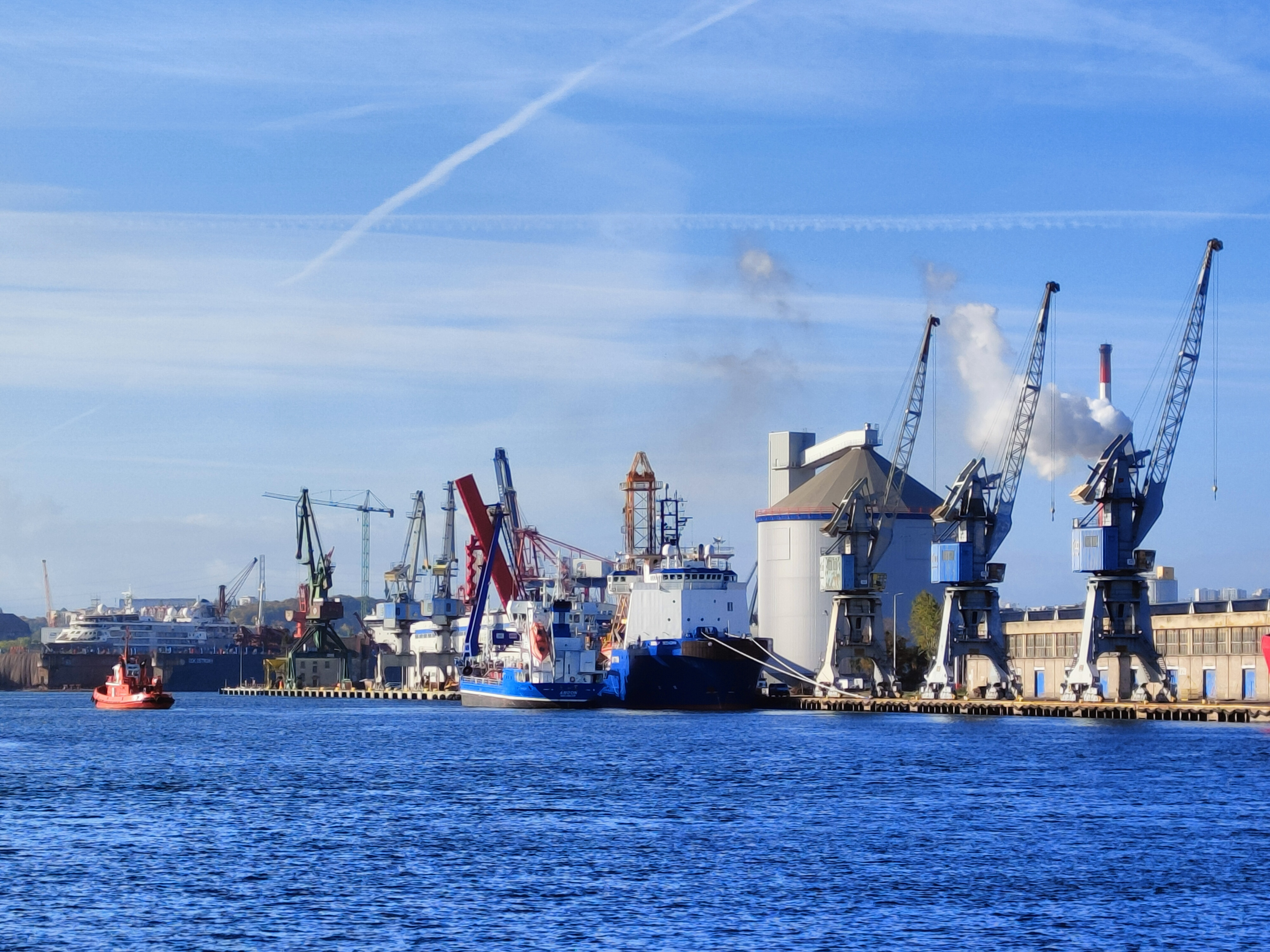
- A view of the Port of Gdańsk (2021)
- Interactive map of Port of Gdańsk

Location
- Country: Poland
- Location: Gdańsk
- Coordinates: 54°23′36″N 18°40′12″E
- UN/LOCODE: PLGDN

Details
- Operated by: Gdańsk Seaport Authority
- Owned by: Government of Poland
- Size of harbour: 412.56 ha (1,019.5 acres)
- Land area: 653 ha (1,610 acres)
- Size: 1,065.56 ha (2,633.1 acres)

Statistics
- Annual cargo tonnage: ▲80,400,000 (2025)
- Annual container volume: ▲2,769,000 (2025)
- Passenger traffic: ▲171,000 (2025)
- Website; Port of Gdańsk

The Port of Gdańsk is a Polish seaport located on the southern coast of Gdańsk Bay in the city of Gdańsk, extending along the Vistula estuary Martwa Wisła, Port Channel and Kashubia Canal. It is one of the largest seaports on the Baltic Sea.

The Port of Gdańsk is divided into two parts, the Inner and Exterior Port.

== Inner Port ==
- Port of Gdańsk Cargo Logistics S.A. - universal port operator providing handling and storage services for bulk and general cargo
- Gdańsk Container Terminal – providing feeder services
- Ferry terminals
  - Polferries
  - Westerplatte
- Phosphates terminal
- Liquid and bulk sulphur terminal
- Fruit handling terminal in the Port Free Zone

The Port of Gdańsk has specialized cargo handling equipment and port infrastructure, enabling among others the handling of grain, fertilizers, lumber, ore, steel and containers, as well as ro-ro vessel servicing.

== Exterior — Northern Port ==
Northern Port is located directly in the water basins of Gdańsk Bay. The largest vessels with a capacity of up to 300,000 tonnes deadweight (DWT) and draft to 15 m that enter the Baltic Sea can be serviced here.

- Baltic Hub Container Terminal
- Coal terminal
- Naftoport — crude oil, heating oils, fuels terminal
- LPG terminal

=== Baltic Hub Container Terminal ===
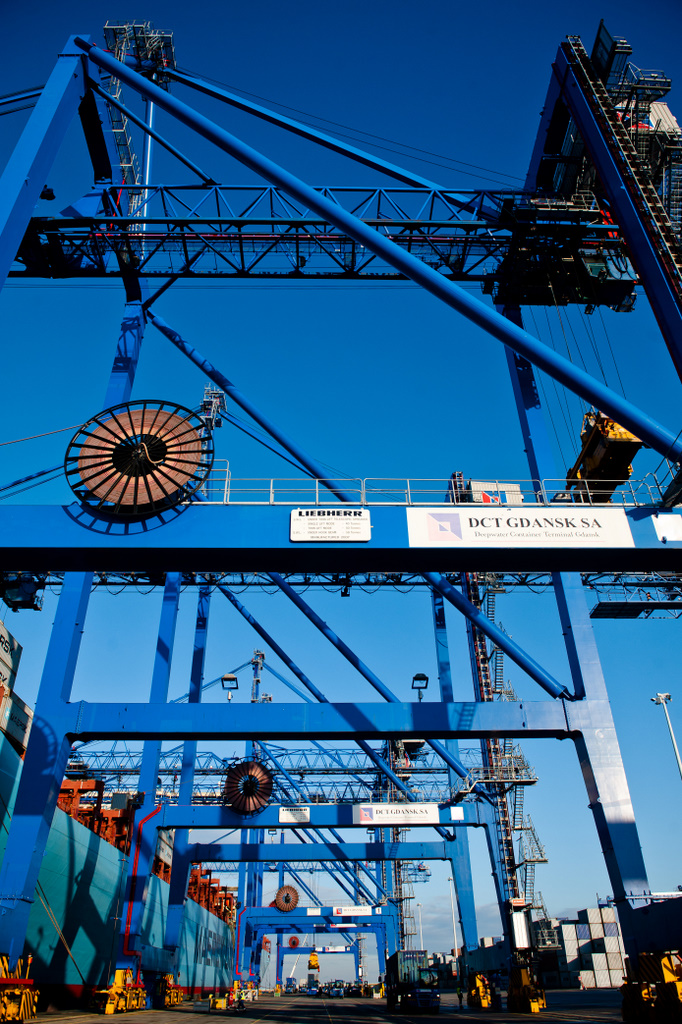
DCT Gdańsk - December 2011

The Baltic Hub Container Terminal 54°22′56″N 18°42′44″E (previously Deepwater Container Terminal) is located in the northern port. It was officially opened on 1 October 2007 and is the largest container terminal in Poland. It also serves as a transshipment hub for Saint Petersburg and other ports in the Baltic Sea region. Currently the handling capacity of the container terminal amounts to 4,500,000 TEU after 2025 modernization.

The terminal has become a springboard for the Polish Maritime Economy. In 2011, some of the largest container ships in the world at that time, the 14,700-TEU capacity Mærsk E-class container ships began regular weekly calls in Gdańsk. These included Evelyn Maersk, Emma Maersk, Eleonora Maersk, Ebba Maersk and Eugen Maersk. DCT Gdańsk reached its first one millionth handling in June 2011. July 2011 saw the implementation of E-SMART, a modern tool by the British company International Terminal Solutions Ltd (ITS). Maersk were the first container line which to introduce direct navigational connection (AE10) from the Far East to the Baltic region.

==== Sea connectivity ====
- Maersk Line AE10 Asia–Europe–Asia (Kwangyang – Ningbo – Shanghai – Yantian – Tanjung Pelepas – Suez Canal – Rotterdam – Bremerhaven– Gdansk – Aarhus – Gothenburg – Bremerhaven – Rotterdam – Algeciras – Suez Canal – Yantian – Kwangyang)
- Gdansk Finnish Gulf Service (Gdansk – Kotka – Helsinki – Gdansk)
- Gdansk – St. Petersburg Service (Gdansk – St. Petersburg – Gdansk)
- OOCL line LL1 Asia-North Europe Loop1 (Shanghai - Ningbo - Xiamen - Yantian - Singapore - Felixstowe - Zeebrugge - Gdansk - Wilhelmshaven - Piraeus)

== Statistics ==
Year	Cargo tons	Containers TEU	Containers tons	Passengers
2010	▲27,200,000	▲512,000	▲4,900,000	▲164,000
2011	▼25,300,000	▲686,000	▲6,100,000	▼155,000
2012	▲26,900,000	▲929,000	▲7,600,000	▼150,000
2013	▲30,300,000	▲1,178,000	▲9,700,000	▼136,000
2014	▲32,300,000	▲1,212,000	▲10,400,000	▲138,000
2015	▲35,900,000	▼1,091,000	▲10,700,000	▼118,000
2016	▲37,300,000	▲1,299,000	▲13,400,000	▼117,000
2017	▲40,600,000	▲1,581,000	▲16,400,000	▲137,000
2018	▲49,000,000	▲1,949,000	▲19,900,000	▲148,000
2019	▲52,200,000	▲2,073,000	▲20,900,000	▲189,000
2020	▼48,000,000	▼1,924,000	▼20,000,000	▼149,000
2021	▲53,200,000	▲2,118,000	▲20,600,000	▲164,000
2022	▲68,200,000	▼2,072,000	▼20,000,000	▲195,000
2023	▲81,000,000	▼2,050,000	▲20,500,000	▼159,000
2024	▼77,400,000	▲2,249,000	▲20,700,000	▲166,000
2025	▲80,400,000	▲2,769,000	▲24,400,000	▲171,000

== Gallery ==
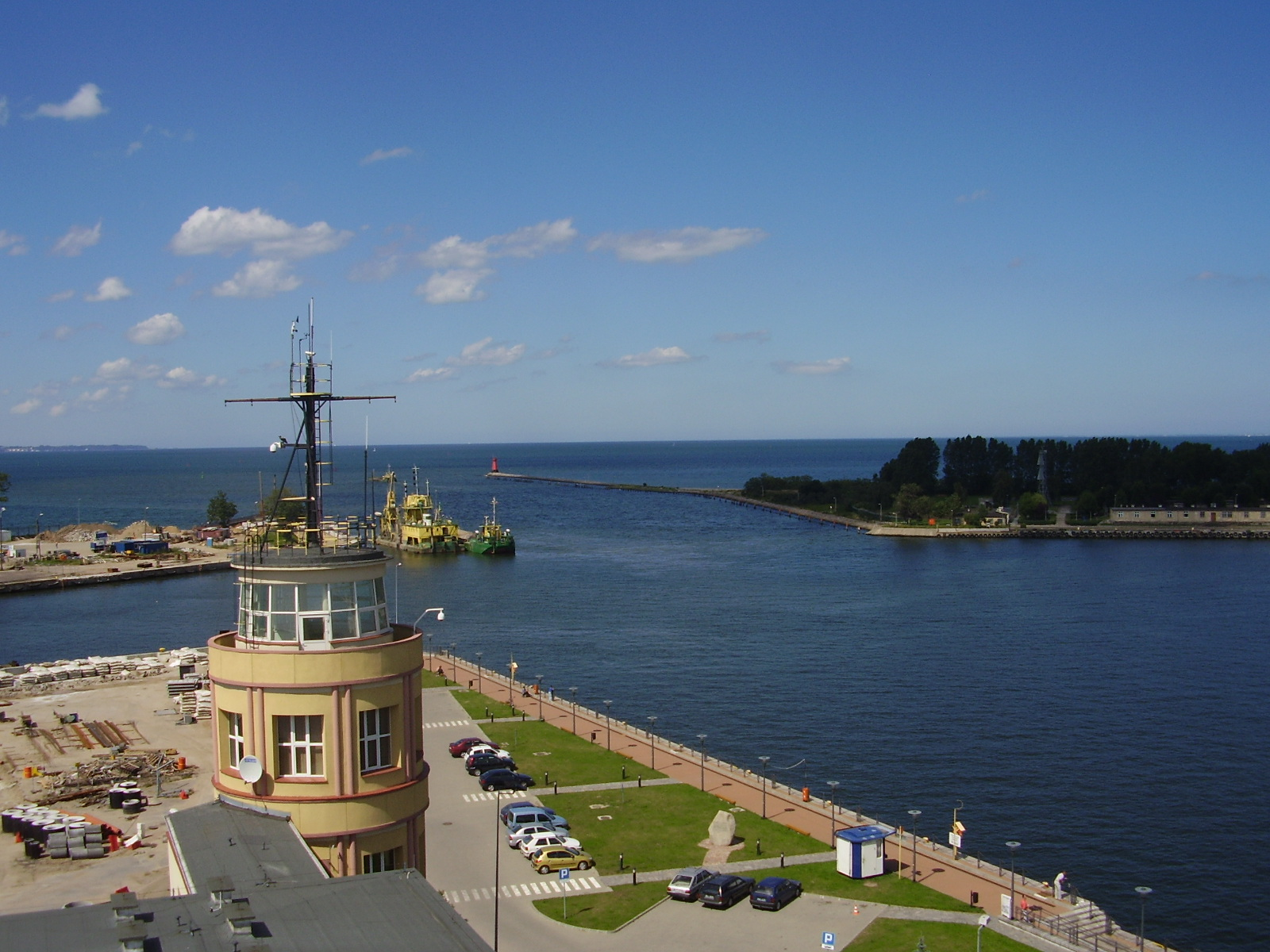
Entrance to the Inner Port

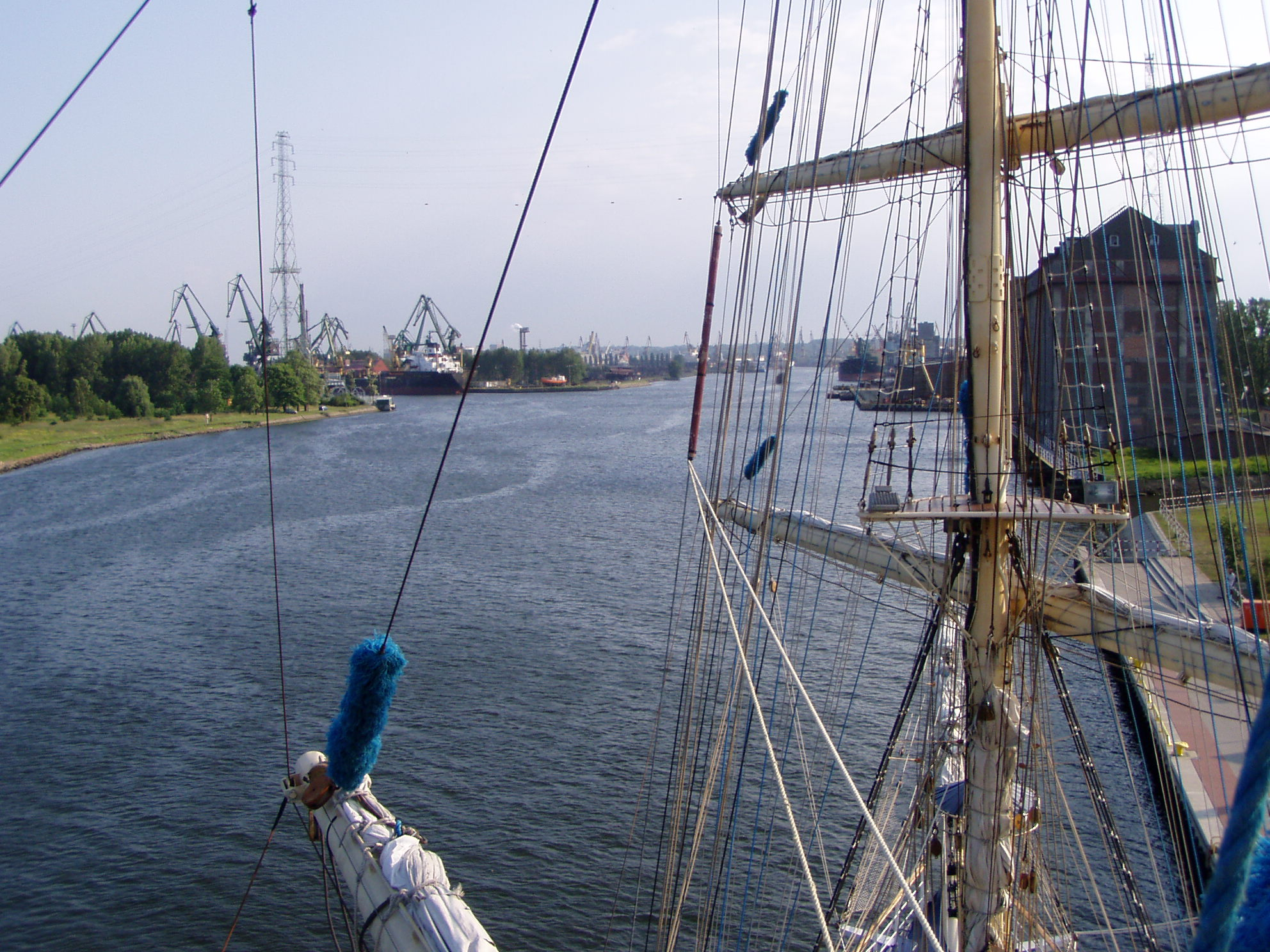
Port of Gdańsk from mainmast of Fryderyk Chopin

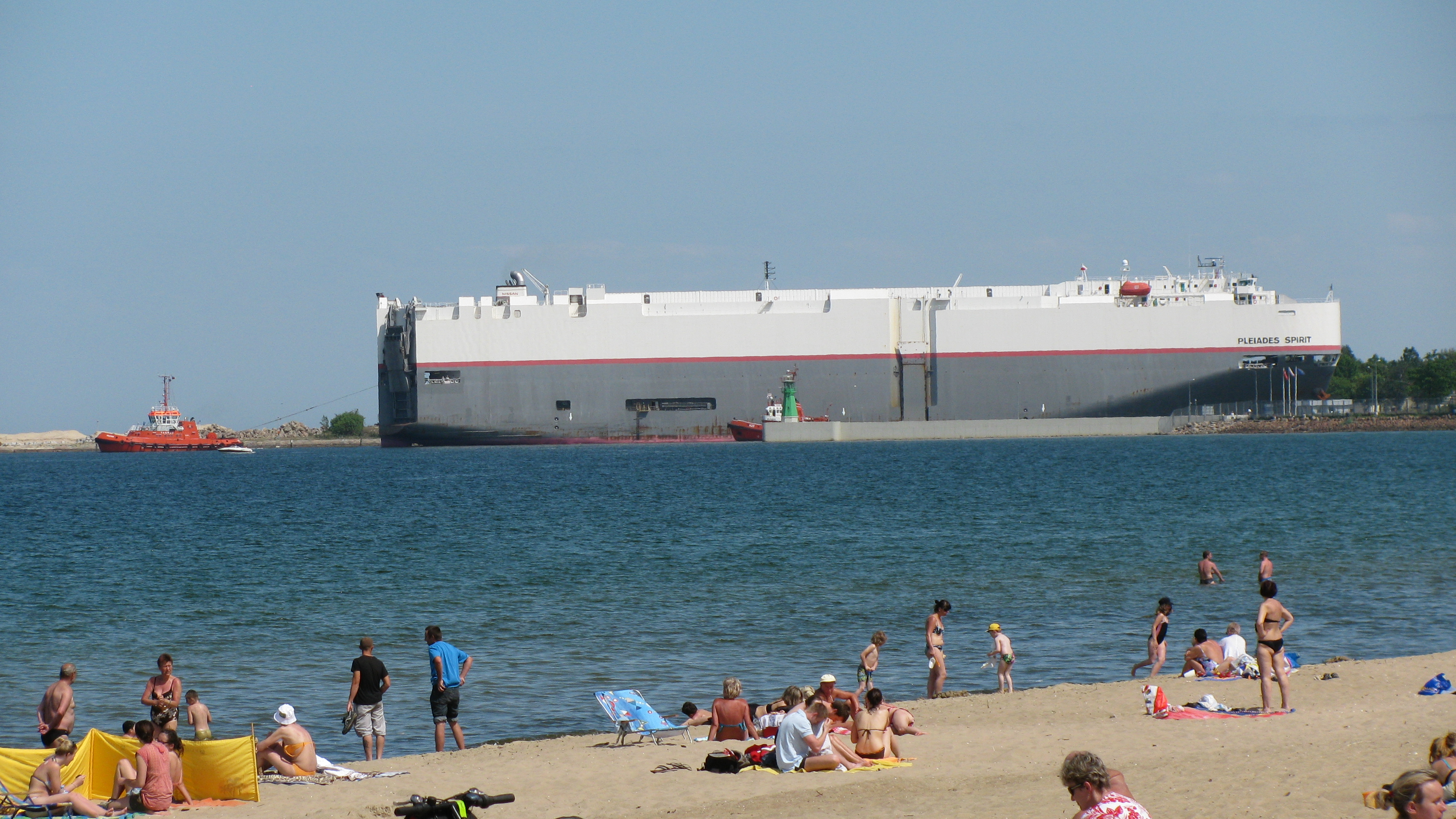
Car carrier in the entrance to the inner port, as seen from the nearby beach

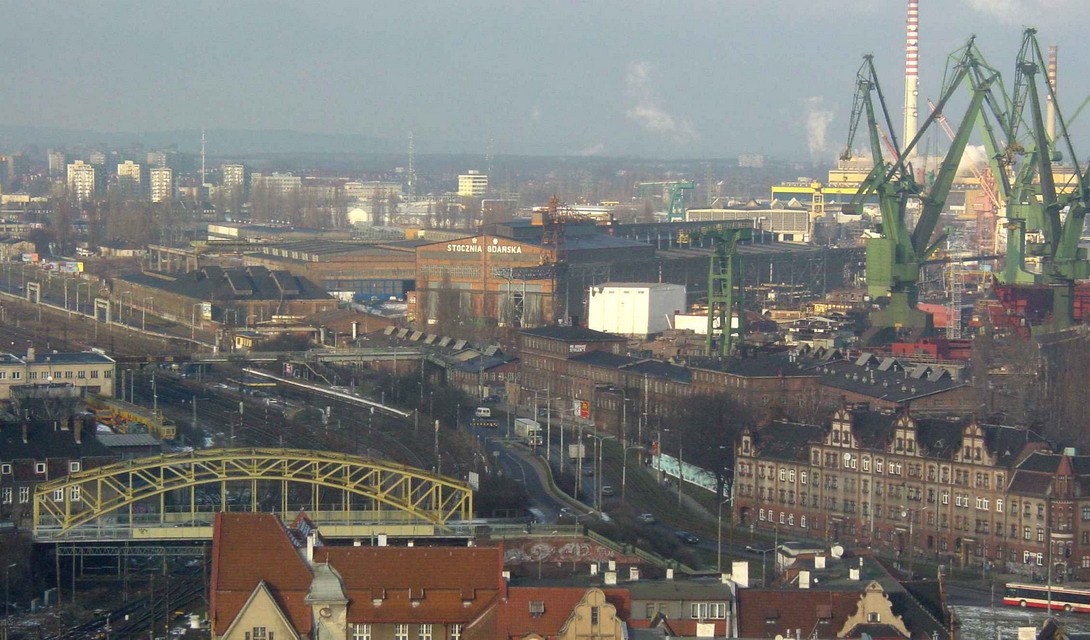
Industrial landscape of the Gdańsk Shipyard

== See also ==
- Gdańsk Shipyard
- Ports of the Baltic Sea
