= Odense Steel Shipyard =

Danish shipbuilding company

Coordinates: 55°28′07″N 10°32′19″E

- Native name: Odense Staalskibsværft
- Industry: Shipbuilding
- Founded: 1917
- Founder: A.P. Møller
- Defunct: 12 January 2012
- Headquarters: Munkebo, Denmark
- Area served: Worldwide
- Products: Cargo ships Tankers; Tugboats; Bulk carriers Container ships Gas carriers Roll-on/roll-off boats Frigates
- Parent: A.P. Moller – Maersk Group
- Divisions: Lindø Industrial Park; Lindø Shipyard

Odense Steel Shipyard (Danish: Odense Staalskibsværft) was a Danish shipyard company located in Odense. It was best known for building container ships for its parent group, A.P. Moller – Maersk Group, including the Mærsk E class in 2006 which at the time were the biggest container ships in the world. The 2008 financial crisis led to Maersk announcing its closure in 2009 and the last new ship was delivered in January 2012.

== Company history ==
The first yard was opened in 1918–1919 by the A.P. Møller company. A new yard with bigger and better facilities was constructed 1957–1959 on a new site located in Munkebo a few kilometres outside Odense proper. Odense Steel Shipyard was the largest yard within the Odense Steel Shipyard Group, which also consisted of two yards and an engineering company, all situated in the Baltic. The yard was known for designing and building innovative vessels that applied the newest technology in design and equipment.

Since 1996 the Yard built some of the world's largest container ships; including the Mærsk E-class with a nominal capacity of 15,550 TEU (originally declared as 11,000 TEU), the highest equivalent number of any vessel as of today. However, Maersk chose Daewoo to build its latest and largest design, the Triple E class with a nominal capacity of 18,000 TEU, as the Asian shipyard was more competitive.

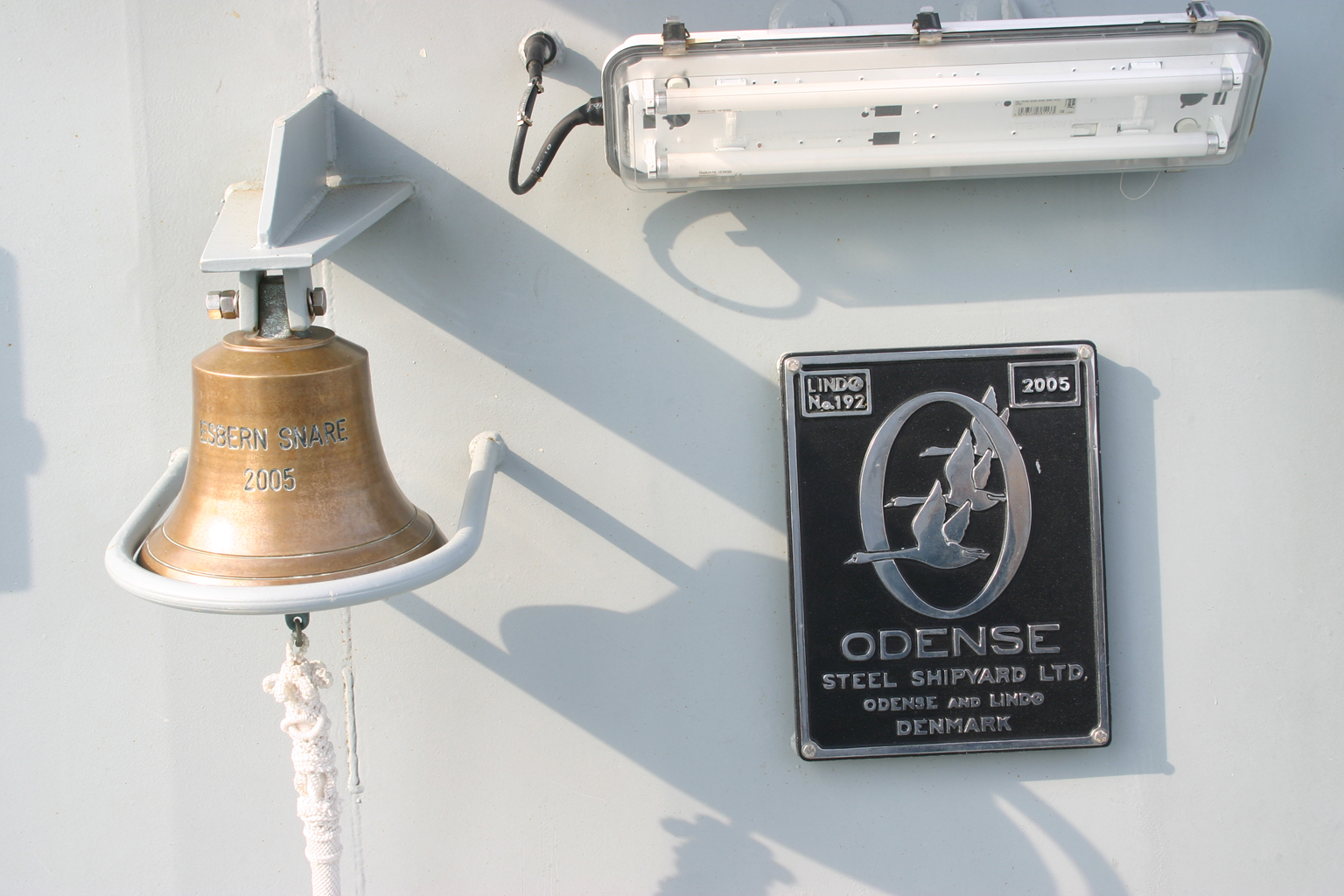
Ship bell and Lindø Yard name-plate onboard HDMS Esbern Snare (L17)

The original shipyard remained in operation until 1966, when all operations were transferred to the new site. Unlike the modern shipyard, the old yard produced civilian and merchant vessels only. Its first completed ship was cargo steamship Robert Mærsk, completed in 1920. Its last production was Yard No. 177, the bulk carrier Laura Mærsk.

=== The new Odense Steel Shipyard (the "Lindø" Yard) ===
The new shipyard originally had two building docks, No. I and II (300 × 45 × 7.5 metres each), allowing the construction of tankers of up to 100,000 tonnes deadweight (DWT). The yard was enlarged in 1967 to include a new very large building dock, No. III (415 × 90 metres), and an 800-ton, 95-metre tall, 148.5-metre span gantry crane, allowing the construction of tankers in the VLCC and ULCC class. The largest construction planned on the yard was two 500,000 DWT tankers, but this order was later cancelled. From the 1960s until 1977, the yard only constructed oil tankers (no larger than 330,000 DWT) as well as bulk carriers. The first RO-RO ship was built in 1979, and the first container ship in 1980. In December 1992, the yard completed the world's first 300,000 DWT double-hull tanker. In January 1996 they delivered its first Post-Panamax container ship. On 3 December 1999 the gantry crane collapsed after a hurricane in the building dock and damaged the ship No.170 Cornelius Mærsk, which was repaired thereafter and delivered two months later. MAN Takraf of Leipzig, Germany, delivered a new 1,000 ton, 110-metre tall gantry crane in April 2001.

The collapse in world shipping during the Great Recession led Maersk to announce in January 2009 that Odense would concentrate on smaller ships but in May 2009 they announced that they would be closing the yard altogether and putting Baltija Shipbuilding Yard in Lithuania up for sale. The last newbuild from Lindø was No.714 Niels Juel, a frigate for the Royal Danish Navy, which was delivered in January 2012.

== After yard closure ==
After the closure of the yard in 2012, the site has been transformed to an industrial park housing a large number of companies within the offshore sector; the Lindoe Offshore Renewables Centre. Most companies work with production, storage and discharge of large components for offshore and heavy industries. The area of more than 1,000,000 square metres (11,000,000 sq ft), of which 166,000 square metres (1,790,000 sq ft) is under roof, combined with the gantry crane and the harbour area makes it ideal for handling heavy industry.

In 2016 elements of the yard Odense Maritime Technology (OMT) were proposing the Iver Huitfeldt-class frigates for the Procurement programme of the Royal Australian Navy's frigates, but built in Australia.

== List of ships built at Lindø ==
No.	Type	Name	Company	Tonnage	Launched
1	Tanker	T S Petersen		29,586	9 March 1962
2	Tanker	Otto N Miller		29,586	22 August 1962
3	Tanker	Angelo Maersk	A P Moller	31,941	2 March 1963
4	Tanker	Elmer R Peterson		30,165	8 June 1963
5	Tanker	Peter Maersk	A P Moller	31,979	14 December 1963
6	Tanker	Roy G Lucks		30,298	15 May 1964
7	Tanker	Prima Maersk	A P Moller	33,018	1 September 1964
8	Tanker	K H Crandall		30,298	12 December 1964
9	Tanker	Seven Skies		52,629	18 April 1965
10	Tanker	A P Moller	A P Moller	52,673	3 September 1965
11	Tanker	Jakob Maersk	A P Moller	48,252	8 January 1966
12	Tanker	Jane Maersk	A P Moller	42,614	5 April 1966
13	Tanker	Eli Maersk	A P Moller	52,602	21 June 1966
14	Tanker	Ferncrest		52,510	17 September 1966
15	Tanker	Ferncastle		52,510	19 October 1966
16	Tanker	Nordhav		52,664	7 January 1967
17	Tanker	Leise Maersk	A P Moller	44,905	11 March 1967
18	Tanker	Naticina		60,703	10 June 1967
19	Tanker	Louis Maersk	A P Moller	44,896	7 July 1967
20	Tanker	Evelyn Maersk	A P Moller	53,227	14 October 1967
21	Tanker	Stavik		52,022	16 December 1967
22	Tanker	Marinula		98876	4 May 1968
23	Tanker	Elisabeth Maersk	A P Moller	53,227	19 March 1968
24	Tanker	Dirch Maersk	A P Moller	103,148	24 August 1968
25	Tanker	Mitra		98,876	23 November 1968
26	Tanker	Dorthe Maersk	A P Moller	103,148	19 April 1969
27	Tanker	Evginia Chandris		103,148	19 April 1969
28	Tanker	Hamilton Lopes		62,619	4 October 1969
29	Tanker	Horta Barbosa		62,619	11 October 1969
30	Tanker	Esso Copenhagen	Esso Transport Co.	112,763	12 December 1969
31	?				
32	Tanker	Esso Skandia	Esso Transport Co.	112,763	17 April 1970
33	Tanker	Texaco Denmark	Texaco	125,424	14 August 1970
34	Tanker	Regina Maersk	A P Moller	143,688	22 May 1971
35	Tanker	Texaco Copenhagen	Texaco	125,424	27 November 1970
36	Tanker	Texaco Norway	Texaco	125.474	19 February 1971
37	Tanker	Rasmine Maersk	A P Moller	143,686	10 September 1971
38	Tanker	Rosa Maersk	A P Moller	143,686	26 November 1971
39	Tanker	Arietta Livanos		129,260	12 February 1972
40	Tanker	Eugenie Livanos		129,260	22 April 1972
41	Tanker	Roy Maersk	A P Moller	143,686	30 June 1972
42	Tanker	Richard Maersk	A P Moller	143,686	29 September 1972
43	Tanker	Romo Maersk	A P Moller	143,686	3 December 1972
44	Tanker	Torill Knudsen		141,873	10 February 1973
45	Tanker	Rania Chandris		142,055	4 May 1973
46	Tanker	Ras Maersk	A P Moller	143,122	6 July 1973
47	Tanker	Robert Maersk	A P Moller	143,122	29 September 1973
48	Tanker	Atlantic Emperor		128,398	7 December 1973
49	Tanker	Atlantic Empress		128,399	16 February 1974
50	Tanker	Kristine Maersk	A P Moller	167,204	8 May 1974
51	Tanker	Katrine Maersk	A P Moller	167,204	10 August 1974
52	Tanker	Limatula	Royal Dutch Shell	160,420	19 October 1974
53	Tanker	Linga	Royal Dutch Shell	160,420	20 December 1974
54	Tanker	Liparus	Royal Dutch Shell	160,420	28 February 1975
55	Tanker	Limnea	Royal Dutch Shell	160,420	23 May 1975
56	Tanker	Kirsten Maersk	A P Moller	167,207	19 August 1975
505	Tug	Maersk Battler	A P Moller	499	8 October 1975
506	Tug	Maersk Beater	A P Moller	499	10 November 1975
57	Tanker	Karoline Maersk	A P Moller	167,207	24 October 1975
58	Tanker	Kate Maersk	A P Moller	167,207	30 January 1976
59	Tanker	Limopsis	Royal Dutch Shell	160,423	7 May 1976
60	Tanker	Lyria	Royal Dutch Shell	160,420	27 August 1976
507	Tug	Maersk Blazer	A P Moller	498	12 November 1976
508	Tug	Maersk Blower	A P Moller	498	23 December 1976
509	Tug	Maersk Boulder	A P Moller	494	11 February 1977
510	Tug	Maersk Breaker	A P Moller	494	11 February 1977
61/1	Tanker	Karama Maersk	A P Moller	167,727	11 February 1977
61/2	Tanker	Nora Maersk	A P Moller	36,220	10 September 1977
62/1	Tanker	Karen Maersk	A P Moller	167,727	10 June 1977
62/2	Tanker	Niels Maersk	A P Moller	39,332	12 December 1977
63/2	Tanker	Nelly Maersk	A P Moller	39,332	15 May 1978
63/3	Tanker	Nicoline Maersk	A P Moller	39,332	16 June 1978
69	Bulk carrier	Torm Herdis	Dampskibsselskabet Torm	26,712	28 October 1977
70	Bulk carrier	Torm Helvig	Dampskibsselskabet Torm	26,712	21 January 1978
71	Bulk carrier	Torm Hilde	Dampskibsselskabet Torm	26,712	28 April 1978
72	Bulk carrier	Torm Helene	Dampskibsselskabet Torm	26,712	25 August 1978
64/2	Tanker	Nele Maersk	A P Moller	39,332	20 October 1978
64/3	Tanker	Nicolai Maersk	A P Moller	39,280	9 February 1979
73	Cargo RO-RO	Eleo Maersk	A P Moller	21,799	8 December 1978
74	Cargo RO-RO	Emma Maersk	A P Moller	21,799	23 March 1979
75	Cargo RO-RO	Estelle Maersk	A P Moller	21,799	3 August 1979
76	Cargo RO-RO	Emilie Maersk	A P Moller	21,799	3 August 1979
77	Cargo RO-RO	Evelyn Maersk	A P Moller	21,799	12 October 1979
78	Cargo RO-RO	Elisabeth Maersk	A P Moller	21,799	2 February 1980
79	Tug/supply ship	Maersk Retriever	A P Moller	1,593	12 October 1979
80	Tug/supply ship	Maersk Runner	A P Moller	1,593	2 February 1980
81	Tug/supply ship	Maersk Ruler	A P Moller	1,592	28 March 1980
82	Tug/supply ship	Maersk Ranger	A P Moller	1,592	28 March 1980
83	3,300 TEU 1980–1982; Maersk L-class container	Laura Maersk	A P Moller	30,694	9 July 1980
84	3,300 TEU 1980–1982; Maersk L-class container	Leise Maersk	A P Moller	30,694	19 September 1980
85	3,300 TEU 1980–1982; Maersk L-class container	Lexa Maersk	A P Moller	30,694	16 January 1981
86	3,300 TEU 1980–1982; Maersk L-class container	Lica Maersk	A P Moller	30,694	20 March 1981
87	3,300 TEU 1980–1982; Maersk L-class container	Leda Maersk	A P Moller	30,694	20 November 1981
88	3,300 TEU 1980–1982; Maersk L-class container	Luna Maersk	A P Moller	36,988	22 January 1982
89	Gas carrier (LPG)	Sally Maersk	A P Moller	14,062	15 April 1981
90	Gas carrier (LPG)	Svendborg Maersk	A P Moller	14,062	3 July 1981
91	Gas carrier (LPG)	Susan Maersk	A P Moller	14,062	4 September 1981
92	Gas carrier (LPG)	Svend Maersk	A P Moller	14,062	2 April 1982
93/1	Tug/supply ship	Maersk Rover	A P Moller	1,593	2 April 1982
93/2	Tug/supply ship	Maersk Rider	A P Moller	1,593	2 April 1982
94	Bulk carrier	Elsam Jylland	Elsam	71,560	1 August 1982
95	Tanker	Dirch Maersk	A P Moller	51,838	3 November 1982
96	Bulk carrier	Elsam Fyn	Elsam	71,560	4 February 1983
97	Tanker	Dorthe Maersk	A P Moller	51,838	22 April 1983
98	Tanker	Dagmar Maersk	A P Moller	51,838	22 September 1983
99	Container	Regina Maersk	A P Moller	36,988	10 July 1983
100	3,000 TEU 1983–1984; Maersk L-class container	Laust Maersk	A P Moller	40,366	2 December 1983
101	3,000 TEU 1983–1984; Maersk L-class container	Louis Maersk	A P Moller	43,431	17 February 1984
102	3,000 TEU 1983–1984; Maersk L-class container	Lars Maersk	A P Moller	43,431	11 May 1984
103	3,000 TEU 1983–1984; Maersk L-class container	Louis Maersk	A P Moller	43,431	17 February 1984
104	Tanker	Olga Maersk	A P Moller	14,102	17 February 1984
105	Tanker	A P Moller	A P Moller	28,010	31 August 1984
106	Tanker	Emma Maersk	A P Moller	28,010	1 March 1985
107	Tanker	Evelyn Maersk	A P Moller	28,010	10 May 1985
108	Tanker	Thyra Torm	Dampskibsselskabet Torm	28,017	23 September 1985
109	Tanker	Torm Gunhild	Dampskibsselskabet Torm		4 April 1986
110	Cargo RO-RO	Sea Wolf		34,318	27 October 1984
111	Cargo RO-RO	American Hawaii		34,318	21 December 1984
112	Cargo RO-RO	American Michigan		34,318	11 July 1985
113	Tanker	Robert Maersk	A P Moller	16,282	3 May 1986
114	Tanker	Ras Maersk	A P Moller	16,282	8 August 1986
115	Tanker	Romo Maersk	A P Moller	16,282	19 September 1986
116	Tug/supply ship	Maersk Master	A P Moller	3,949	31 January 1986
117	Tug/supply ship	Maersk Mariner	A P Moller	3,949	31 January 1986
118	Tanker	Rita Maersk	A P Moller	16,282	14 November 1986
119	Tanker	Rasmine Maersk	A P Moller	16,282	30 November 1986
120	Container	McKinney Maersk	A P Moller	43,432	12 November 1985
121	Tanker	Estelle Maersk	A P Moller	27,997	26 June 1987
122	Tanker	Eleo Maersk	A P Moller	27,997	4 September 1987
123	4,400 TEU 1988–1991; Maersk M-class container	Marchen Maersk	A P Moller	52,191	12 February 1988
124	4,400 TEU 1988–1991; Maersk M-class container	Marit Maersk	A P Moller	52,191	17 June 1988
125	4,400 TEU 1988–1991; Maersk M-class container	Margrethe Maersk	A P Moller	52,191	28 February 1988
126	4,400 TEU 1988–1991; Maersk M-class container	Majestic Maersk	A P Moller	52,181	15 February 1990
127	4,400 TEU 1988–1991; Maersk M-class container	Marie Maersk	A P Moller	52,181	8 June 1990
128	4,400 TEU 1988–1991; Maersk M-class container	Magleby Maersk	A P Moller	52,181	10 October 1990
129	4,400 TEU 1988–1991; Maersk M-class container	Mette Maersk	A P Moller	52,191	24 February 1989
130	4,400 TEU 1988–1991; Maersk M-class container	Mathilde Maersk	A P Moller	52,191	23 June 1989
131	4,400 TEU 1988–1991; Maersk M-class container	Maren Maersk	A P Moller	52,191	27 October 1989
132	4,400 TEU 1988–1991; Maersk M-class container	McKinney Maersk	A P Moller	52,181	1991
133	4,400 TEU 1988–1991; Maersk M-class container	Madison Maersk	A P Moller	52,181	8 May 1991
134	4,400 TEU 1988–1991; Maersk M-class container	Mayview Maersk	A P Moller	52,181	4 September 1991
135	1,550 TEU 1991–1992; Maersk C-class container	Chastine Maersk	A P Moller	16,982	1 November 1991
136	1,550 TEU 1991–1992; Maersk C-class container	Charlotte Maersk	A P Moller	16,982	8 January 1992
137	1,550 TEU 1991–1992; Maersk C-class container	Cornelia Maersk	A P Moller	16,982	21 February 1992
138	1,550 TEU 1991–1992; Maersk C-class container	Clifford Maersk	A P Moller	16,982	3 April 1992
139	1,550 TEU 1991–1992; Maersk C-class container	Clara Maersk	A P Moller	18,979	27 May 1992
140	1,550 TEU 1991–1992; Maersk C-class container	Christian Maersk	A P Moller	18,979	17 July 1992
141	Tanker	Eleo Maersk	A P Moller	158,475	8 November 1992
142	Tanker	Elisabeth Maersk	A P Moller	158,475	12 March 1993
143	Tanker	Emma Maersk	A P Moller	158,475	2 July 1993
144	Tanker	Estelle Maersk	A P Moller	158,475	22 October 1993
145	Tanker	Ellen Maersk	A P Moller	158,475	1 April 1995
146	Tanker	Evelyn Maersk	A P Moller	158,475	28 June 1995
147	Order cancelled				
148	Tanker	Suhail Star		159,222	17 June 1994
149	Tanker	Gemini Star		159,222	1 October 1994
150	Tanker	Alphard Star		159,417	23 December 1994
151	1,600 TEU 1993–1994; Maersk C-class container	Caroline Maersk	A P Moller	20,842	7 December 1993
152	1,600 TEU 1993–1994; Maersk C-class container	Claes Maersk	A P Moller	20,842	26 January 1994
153	1,600 TEU 1993–1994; Maersk C-class container	Cecilie Maersk	A P Moller	20,842	6 March 1994
154	6,000 TEU 1995–1997; Maersk K-class container	Regina Maersk	A P Moller	81,488	18 November 1995
155	6,000 TEU 1995–1997; Maersk K-class container	Knud Maersk	A P Moller	81,488	9 March 1996
156	6,000 TEU 1995–1997; Maersk K-class container	Kate Maersk	A P Moller	81,488	21 June 1996
157	6,000 TEU 1995–1997; Maersk K-class container	Karen Maersk	A P Moller	81,488	4 October 1996
158	6,000 TEU 1995–1997; Maersk K-class container	Katrine Maersk	A P Moller	81,488	3 January 1997
159	6,000 TEU 1995–1997; Maersk K-class container	Kirsten Maersk	A P Moller	81,488	4 April 1997
160	6,600 TEU 1997–1998; Maersk S-class container	Sovereign Maersk	A P Moller	91,560	31 July 1997
161	6,600 TEU 1997–1998; Maersk S-class container	Susan Maersk	A P Moller	91,560	24 October 1997
162	6,600 TEU 1997–1998; Maersk S-class container	Sally Maersk	A P Moller	91,560	23 January 1998
163	6,600 TEU 1997–1998; Maersk S-class container	Sine Maersk	A P Moller	91,560	24 April 1998
164	6,600 TEU 1997–1998; Maersk S-class container	Svendborg Maersk	A P Moller	91,560	14 August 1998
598	Tug	Freja	A P Moller	323	23 May 1998
599	Tug	Frigga	A P Moller	323	22 August 1998
165	6,600 TEU 1998–2000; Maersk S-class container	Sofie Maersk	A P Moller	91,560	30 October 1998
166	6,600 TEU 1998–2000; Maersk S-class container	Svend Maersk	A P Moller	90,503	29 January 1999
167	6,600 TEU 1998–2000; Maersk S-class container	Soro Maersk	A P Moller	90,560	23 April 1999
168	6,600 TEU 1998–2000; Maersk S-class container	Skagen Maersk	A P Moller	90,560	28 July 1999
169	6,600 TEU 1998–2000; Maersk S-class container	Clifford Maersk	A P Moller	90,560	8 October 1999
170	6,600 TEU 1998–2000; Maersk S-class container	Cornelius Maersk	A P Moller	90,560	4 February 2000
171	3,700 TEU 2001; Maersk L-class container	Laura Maersk	A P Moller	50,721	31 March 2001
172	3,700 TEU 2001; Maersk L-class container	Laust Maersk	A P Moller	50,721	1 April 2001
173	3,700 TEU 2001; Maersk L-class container	Leda Maersk	A P Moller	50,721	19 June 2001
174	3,700 TEU 2001; Maersk L-class container	Lexa Maersk	A P Moller	50,721	17 August 2001
175	3,700 TEU 2001; Maersk L-class container	Lica Maersk	A P Moller	50,721	28 September 2001
176	3,700 TEU 2001; Maersk L-class container	Luna Maersk	A P Moller	50,721	9 November 2001
177	6,600 TEU 2000–2002; Maersk C-class container	A P Moller	A P Moller	91,560	20 April 2000
178	6,600 TEU 2000–2002; Maersk C-class container	Caroline Maersk	A P Moller	91,560	7 July 2000
179	6,600 TEU 2000–2002; Maersk C-class container	Carsten Maersk	A P Moller	91,560	6 October 2000
180	6,600 TEU 2000–2002; Maersk C-class container	Chastine Maersk	A P Moller	91,560	25 December 2000
181	6,600 TEU 2000–2002; Maersk C-class container	Charlotte Maersk	A P Moller	91,560	25 January 2002
182	6,600 TEU 2000–2002; Maersk C-class container	Cornelia Maersk	A P Moller	91,921	12 April 2002
183	6,600 TEU 2000–2002; Maersk C-class container	Columbine Maersk	A P Moller	91,921	
184	6,600 TEU 2000–2002; Maersk C-class container	Clementine Maersk	A P Moller	91,921	2 October 2002
185	6,600 TEU 2003–2004; Maersk A-class container	Axel Maersk	A P Moller	93,469	
186	6,600 TEU 2003–2004; Maersk A-class container	Anna Maersk	A P Moller	93,469	
187	6,600 TEU 2003–2004; Maersk A-class container	Arnold Maersk	A P Moller	93,469	
188	6,600 TEU 2003–2004; Maersk A-class container	Arthur Maersk	A P Moller	93,469	
189	6,600 TEU 2003–2004; Maersk A-class container	Adrian Maersk	A P Moller	93,469	
190	6,600 TEU 2003–2004; Maersk A-class container	Albert Maersk	A P Moller	93,469	
191	Support ship	Absalon (L16)	Danish Navy	6,300	25 February 2004
192	Support ship	Esbern Snare (L17)	Danish Navy	6,300	24 June 2004
193	3,700 TEU 2004–2005 container	Lars Maersk	A P Moller	50,657	2004
194	3,700 TEU 2004–2005 container	Safmarine Nomazwe	A P Moller	50,657	2004
195	3,700 TEU 2004–2005 container	Safmarine Nokwanda	A P Moller	50,657	2005
196	3,700 TEU 2004–2005 container	Dal Kalahari		50,657	2005
197	7,000 TEU 2005–2006; Maersk D-class container	Gudrun Maersk	A P Moller	97,933	2005
198	7,000 TEU 2005–2006; Maersk D-class container	Grete Maersk	A P Moller	97,933	2005
199	7,000 TEU 2005–2006; Maersk D-class container	Gunvor Maersk	A P Moller	97,933	2005
200	7,000 TEU 2005–2006; Maersk D-class container	Gjertrud Maersk	A P Moller	97,933	2005
201	7,000 TEU 2005–2006; Maersk D-class container	Gerd Maersk	A P Moller	97,933	2006
202	7,000 TEU 2005–2006; Maersk D-class container	Georg Maersk	A P Moller	97,933	2006
203	11,000 TEU 2006–2008; Maersk E-class container	Emma Mærsk	A P Moller	170,749	2006
204	11,000 TEU 2006–2008; Maersk E-class container	Estelle Mærsk	A P Moller	170,749	2006
205	11,000 TEU 2006–2008; Maersk E-class container	Eleonora Mærsk	A P Moller	170,749	2007
206	11,000 TEU 2006–2008; Maersk E-class container	Evelyn Mærsk	A P Moller	170,749	2007
207	11,000 TEU 2006–2008; Maersk E-class container	Ebba Mærsk	A P Moller	170,749	2007
208	11,000 TEU 2006–2008; Maersk E-class container	Elly Maersk	A P Moller	170,749	2007
209	11,000 TEU 2006–2008; Maersk E-class container	Edith Mærsk	A P Moller	170,749	2007
210	11,000 TEU 2006–2008; Maersk E-class container	Eugen Mærsk	A P Moller	170,749	2008
211	7,000 TEU, 2008–2009; Maersk M-class container	Margrethe Maersk	A P Moller	98,268	2008
212	7,000 TEU, 2008–2009; Maersk M-class container	Marchen Maersk	A P Moller	98,268	2008
213	7,000 TEU, 2008–2009; Maersk M-class container	Maren Maersk	A P Moller	98,268	2008
214	7,000 TEU, 2008–2009; Maersk M-class container	Mette Maersk	A P Moller	98,268	2008
215	7,000 TEU, 2008–2009; Maersk M-class container	Marit Maersk	A P Moller	98,268	2009
216	7,000 TEU, 2008–2009; Maersk M-class container	Mathilde Maersk	A P Moller	98,268	2009
217	Ro-Ro	Maas Viking	Epic Shipping	3,663 lane meters	2009
218	Ro-Ro	Humber Viking	Pacific Basin	3,663 lane meters	2009
219	Ro-Ro	Wessex	Epic Shipping	3,663 lane meters	2010
220	Ro-Ro	Strait of Messina	Pacific Basin	3,663 lane meters	2011
221	Ro-Ro	Mercia	Epic Shipping	3,663 lane meters	2010
222	Ro-Ro	Cragside	Yard completion (Epic Shipping) transferred to The Maersk Company Ltd, 2011	3,663 lane meters	2010
223	Bulk carrier	Aquamarine	Carras Hellas	182,060 dwt	2009
224	Bulk carrier	Aquaprincess	Carras Hellas	182,060 dwt	2009
225	Bulk carrier	Aquadiva	Carras Hellas	182,060 dwt	2010
226	Bulk carrier	Aquavictory	Carras Hellas	182,060 dwt	2010
227	Bulk carrier	Order cancelled	Carras Hellas		
228	Bulk carrier	Order cancelled	Carras Hellas		
231	Bulk carrier	Epic	Nereus Shipping (Lemos)	182,060 dwt	2010
232	Bulk carrier	Heroic	Nereus Shipping (Lemos)	182,060 dwt	2010
233	Ro-Ro	Strait of Magellan	Pacific Basin	3,663 lane meters	2011
234	Ro-Ro	Bering Strait	Pacific Basin	3,663 lane meters	2012
714	Iver Huitfeldt-class frigate	Iver Huitfeldt (F361)	Danish Navy	6,645	21 January 2011
715	Iver Huitfeldt-class frigate	Peter Willemoes (F362)	Danish Navy	6,645	23 June 2011
716	Iver Huitfeldt-class frigate	Niels Juel (F363)	Danish Navy	6,645	12 January 2012
