= Estelle Mærsk =

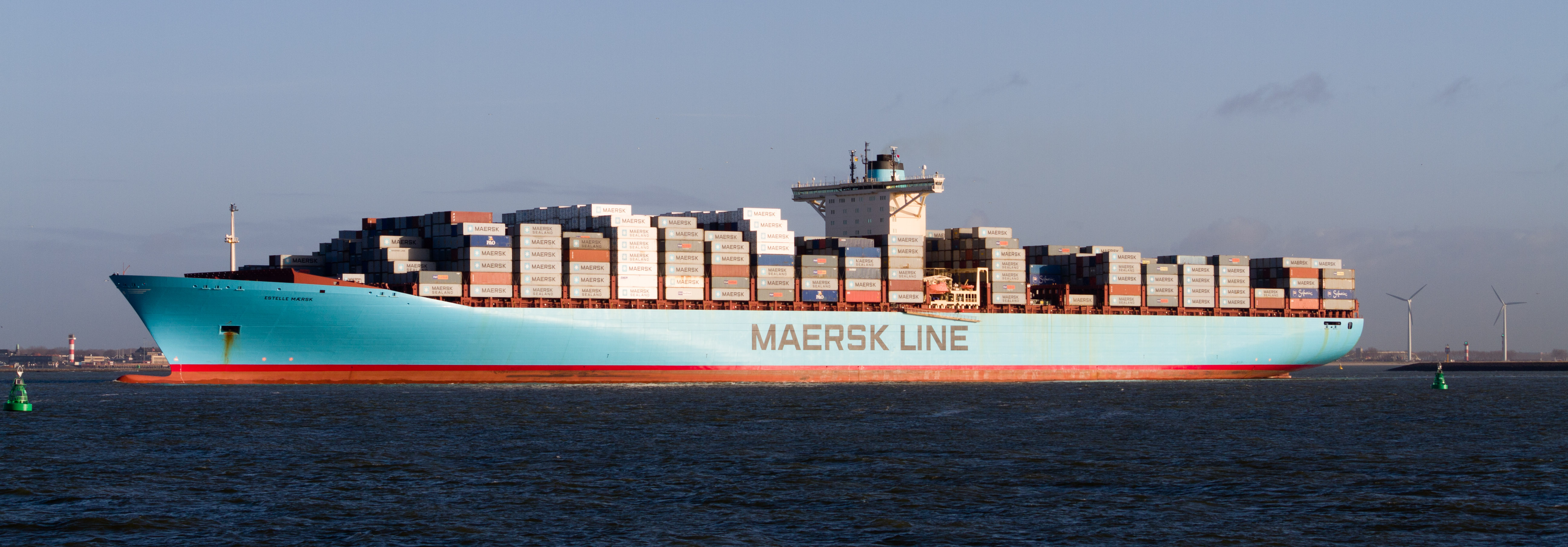
- Estelle Maersk leaving Rotterdam.

History
- Name: Estelle Mærsk
- Owner: Maersk Line
- Port of registry: Hellerup, Denmark
- Builder: Odense Steel Shipyard
- Yard number: 204
- Launched: 25 August 2006
- Identification: IMO number: 9321495
- Status: Operational

General characteristics
- Class & type: E-class container ship
- Tonnage: 170,794 GT; 156,907 tonnes deadweight (DWT)
- Length: 1,302.5 ft (397.0 m)
- Beam: 183.7 ft (56.0 m)
- Depth: 98.4 ft (30.0 m)
- Installed power: Wärtsilä diesel engine; 85,000 kW (114,000 hp)
- Capacity: 14,700 TEU; 1000 TEU (Reefers)
- Crew: 13

Estelle Mærsk is a container ship owned and run by the Maersk Line. She was, in 2009, the largest ever built by terms of gross tonnage. Estelle Mærsk has a capacity of 11,000 twenty-foot equivalent units (TEU), including around 1,000 40-foot (12 m) reefer containers, though a maximum capacity of 13,500 TEU is claimed. She is identical to the seven other ships in the E class, the first built of which was Emma Maersk.

The Estelle Mærsk is 1,302.5 feet (397.0 m) long and has a gross tonnage of 151,687. Her beam (width) is 183.7 feet (56.0 m). She is powered by a Wärtsilä diesel engine, assisted by a waste heat recovery system, that can produce between 80,000 and 90,000 kilowatts (110,000 and 120,000 hp) of power. A coat of environmentally safe silicone paint is used on the hull below the waterline, reducing drag and thus increasing speed and saving up to 1,200 tons of fuel per year. Estelle Mærsk was built by Odense Steel Shipyard of Denmark in 2006. Mærsk claim that these technologies, and staying below 10 knots (19 km/h; 12 mph) whenever possible, reduce emissions by around 25% compared to other ships.

An older ship of the same name was attacked with rocket propelled grenades by Iranians near Dubai in 1987, many years before the current Estelle was built.
