= Edith Mærsk =

Maersk E-Class containership

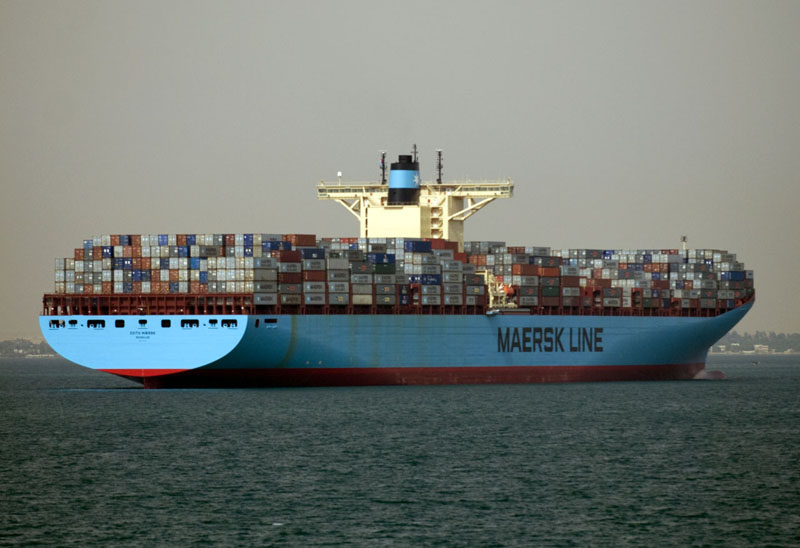
- Edith Mærsk

History
- Name: Edith Mærsk
- Operator: Maersk
- Port of registry: Singapore Singapore
- Builder: Odense Steel Shipyard
- Yard number: L209
- Launched: 18 September 2007
- Acquired: 3 November 2007
- Identification: IMO number: 9321548; Call sign: OXOR2; MMSI number: 220501000
- Status: Currently in service

General characteristics
- Class & type: Mærsk E-class container ship
- Tonnage: 156,907 metric tons (deadweight tonnage); 170,794 (gross tons)
- Length: 397.00 m (1,302.49 ft)
- Beam: 56.00 m (183.73 ft)
- Draught: 17.5 m (57 ft)
- Propulsion: Wärtsilä engine; 80,000 kW
- Speed: 26.0 knots (48 km/h) (maximum); 25.2 knots (47 km/h) (cruising)
- Capacity: 13,500 20ft containers (company statistics); 11,000 TEU (IMO calculations)
- Crew: 13

Edith Mærsk is a container ship and the sister ship of Emma Mærsk. She has capacity for 13,500 containers; calculations from Maersk Line company say that it has only 11,000 TEUs capacity. She can reach up to 15,200 TEUs according to specialists.

== Design ==
The ship has a length of 397.00 m (1,302.49 ft) and a beam of 56.00 m (183.73 ft). The depth of the Edith Mærsk is 30.00 m (98.43 ft) and while fully loaded she can reach a draft of 17.5 m (57 ft). The deadweight of the container ship is 156,907 metric tons, while the gross tonnage is 170,794 gross tons. The ship is powered by a 14-cylinder Wärtsilä RT-flex diesel engine with a power of 80,000 kW. Designers decided that this power is not enough for the ship and added a waste heat recovery system, which increased the power to 90,000 kW. The ship was originally registered in the port of Roskilde, Denmark in spite of higher taxes, but in 2025 was re-flagged to a Singapore registration.

== History ==
Edith Mærsk was built by the Odense Steel Shipyard, Denmark and was handed over to the A.P. Moller – Maersk Group on Saturday 3 November 2007.
