= MV Ocean Trader =

Support ship operated by US Navy

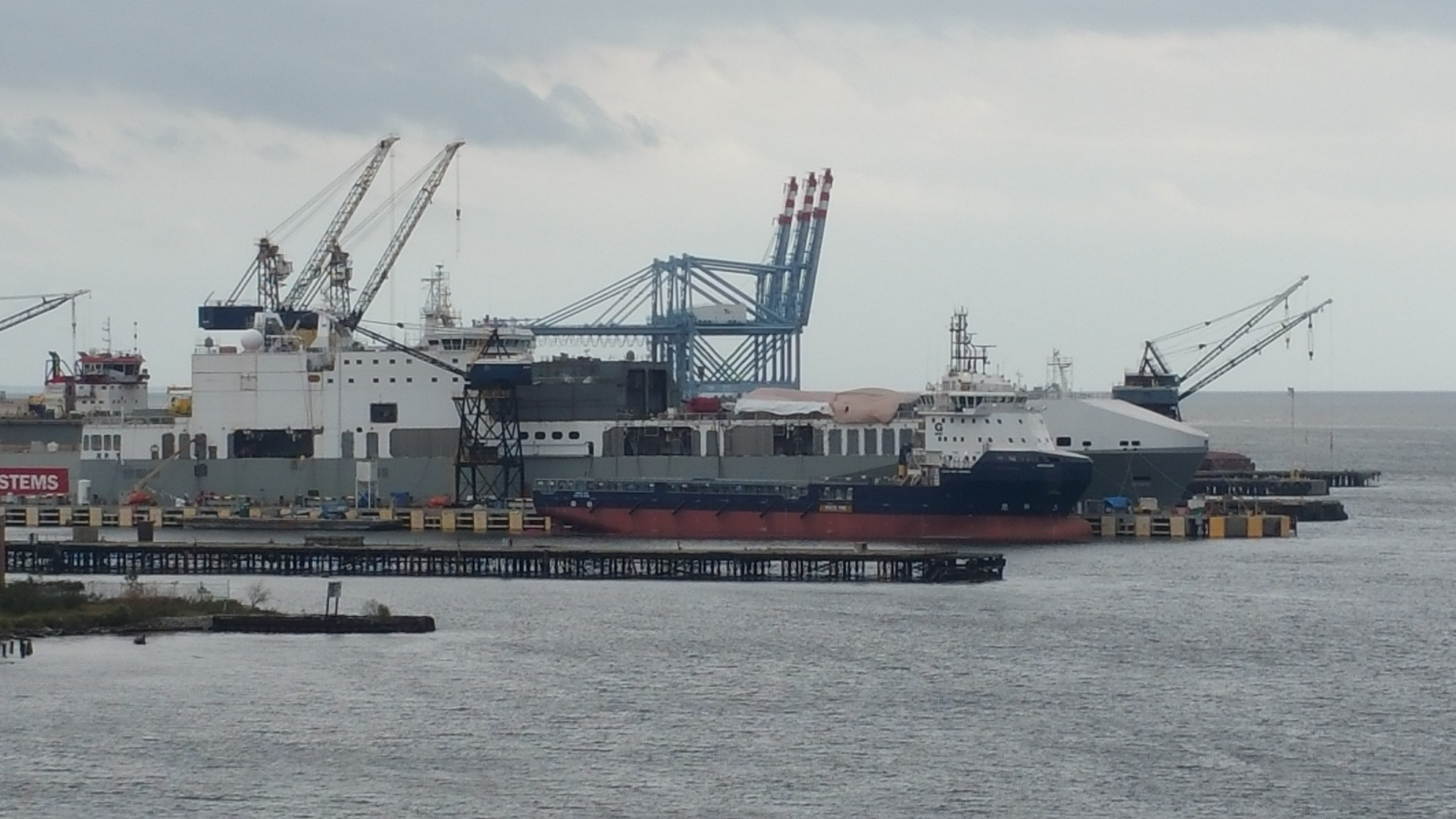

History
- Name: MV Ocean Trader
- Builder: Odense Steel Shipyard

General characteristics
- Displacement: 20,650 long tons (20,980 t)
- Length: 633 ft (193 m)
- Beam: 85.3 ft (26.0 m)
- Draft: 18.4 ft (5.6 m)
- Speed: 20 kn (37 km/h)
- Complement: 50 civilian crew, 159 special forces

MV Ocean Trader (ex-Cragside) is a Special Warfare Support vessel operated by the United States Military Sealift Command.

The vessel has been proposed to serve as a special operations base for up to 200 troops, hangar bays for helicopters, gyms and weapons lockers.

== History ==
In 2010 and 2011, the US Joint Special Operations Command operated a leased vessel off the coast of Somalia. Commanded by an officer from the US Navy, the vessel was in Task Force 484, the JSOC task force for the Horn of Africa and Yemen. Leased from the Edison Chouest Offshore firm, it reportedly had the capability to accommodate Navy SEALs, RHIBs and a helicopter. It reportedly focused mostly on collecting SIGINT equipment provided and operated by Navy SEALs. It is likely that the ship was a stopgap measure before a permanent ship, the Ocean Trader, could be acquired.

In 2010, Cragside was launched by Odense Steel Shipyard, and completed in 2011 for Maersk Line.

In November 2013, Maersk was awarded a $73 million contract to convert the ship.

The US Navy's Request For Proposal called for a dual-screw ship capable of sustaining 20 knots speed with a range of 8,000 miles, with 45 days endurance for a crew of 50 persons, augmented by a surge of up to 159 additional government personnel, and able to be refueled and re-provisioned underway for an additional 45 days' endurance for all 209 personnel.

The vessel was to include capability to embark, hangar, launch and recover all rotary wing aircraft in the SOF inventory up to the size of the MH-53E, provide multiple refueling points for aircraft, capacity for 150,000 gallons of JP-5 fuel, carry and launch 4 boats of 12.3m length, two simultaneously within 20 minutes, and be able to carry, launch, and recover 8 jet skis and Zodiac inflatables. Modifications seen include a cavernous double hangar bay on the top deck forward of the bridge, and the conversion of the upper cargo deck immediately beneath the flight deck to handle the launch of boats.

Unseen modifications included the addition of multiple dedicated maintenance and repair workshops for aircraft, UAVs, and small craft, dive lockers and service facilities for up to 60 NSWF personnel and their equipment, a 40-person SCIF (sensitive compartmented information facility), 20 person communications suite, berthing for at least 209 personnel, and an emergency medical/surgical suite capable of accommodating at least 10 battle casualties.

External FLIR monitoring and six 0.5-inch machine-gun pintle mounts for local security were part of the upgrade. Numerous satellite antenna and communication masts are installed on the upper decks. All modifications included the requirement to operate in areas with ambient outside temperatures of 110 °F (43 °C) and sea temperatures of 95 °F (35 °C) for extended periods in stationary location, indicating the Horn of Africa and waters contiguous to the Saudi Arabian peninsula would be the ship's primary area of deployment.

== Deployment ==
The ship was in service as of 2017, and was reported to have operated in the Mediterranean and Baltic Seas.

In January 2018, a photo of the ship was taken at the Al Duqm Port & Drydock in Oman.

In June 2018, it was photographed docked in Victoria in the Seychelles.

In 2022, the ship was photographed off the coast of Somalia, and a photograph surfaced of operators from Delta Force in front of an Aviation Technology Office Mi-171E

In August 2024, it was seen in Piraeus, following up on a Middle East crisis.

In September 2025, the ship was spotted in the Caribbean sea.

On January 3rd 2026, the ship participated in Operation Absolute Resolve, the operation undertaken to capture Nicolás Maduro.
