= Elly Maersk =

E class container ship

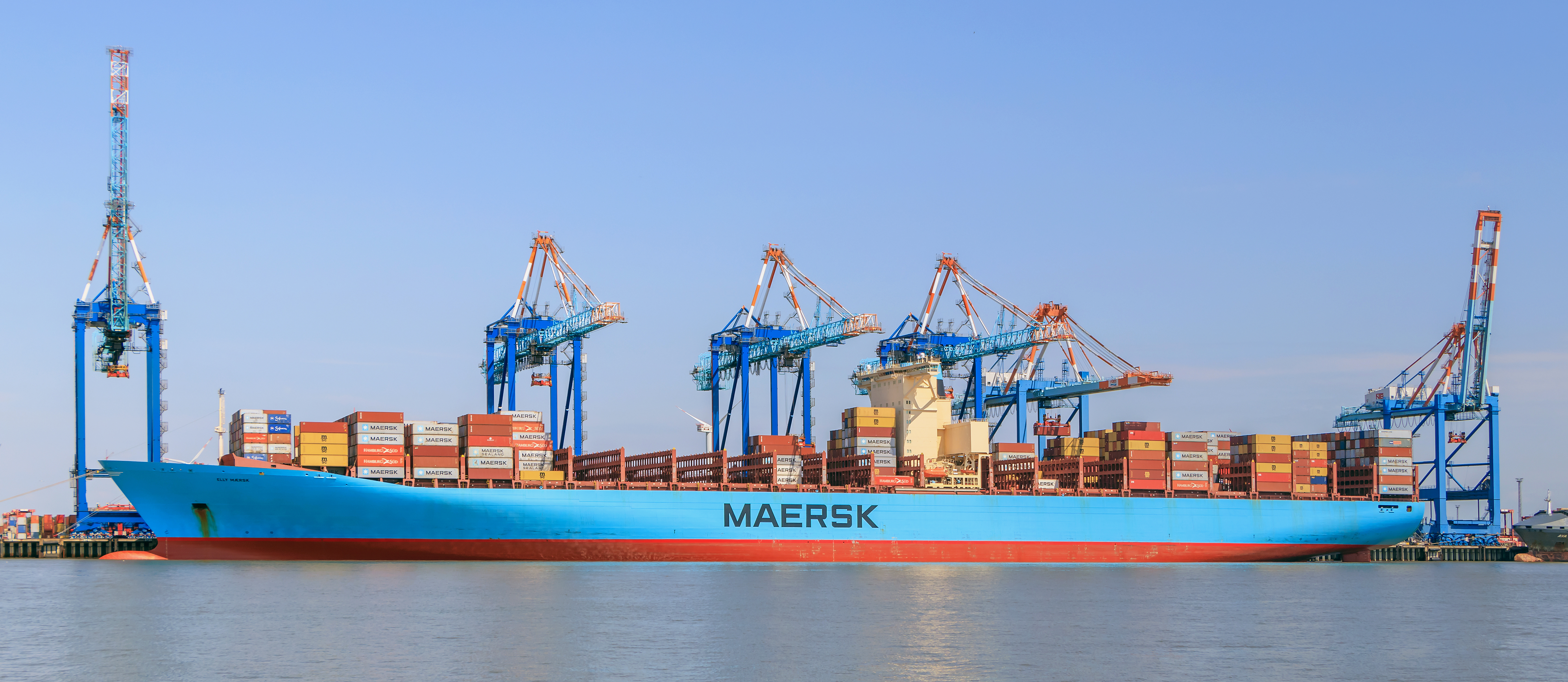
- Elly Mærsk at Bremerhaven.

History
- Name: Elly Maersk
- Owner: A. P. Moller-Maersk Group
- Operator: Maersk Line
- Port of registry: Svendborg, Denmark
- Builder: Odense Steel Shipyard
- Yard number: 208
- Launched: 28 June 2007
- Christened: 25 August 2007
- Completed: 23 September 2007
- Identification: IMO number: 9321536; Call Sign: OXHY2; MMSI number: 220499000; Official No: D4261
- Status: In active service

General characteristics
- Class & type: Mærsk E-class container ship
- Length: 397 m (1,302 ft)
- Beam: 56 m (184 ft)
- Draught: 16 m (52 ft)
- Depth: 30 m (98 ft)
- Installed power: 80,905 kW, 109,998 hp
- Propulsion: 1 diesel electric
- Speed: 26 knots (48 km/h; 30 mph)

Elly Maersk is one of the eight E-class container ships operated by the A.P. Moller-Maersk Group.

== Hull and engine ==
Elly Maersk was built by the Odense Steel Shipyard in yard 208 and was completed on 23 September 2007. It is a fully cellular container ship with 23 holds, with a total carrying capacity of 15,500 TEU. The ship is 397 m (1,302 ft) in length and 56 m (184 ft) across the beam as well as 19.4 metres (64 ft) high. Upon completion the hull was painted with an environmentally friendly silicone paint that would improve the ship's performance and lower its fuel consumption.

The vessel is powered by a Wärtsilä-Sulzer 14RTFLEX96-C diesel electric engine, capable of producing 80,905 kW (109,998 hp) driving one propeller. This two-stroke, 14-cylinder engine was built by the Doosan Engine Company in Changwan. When constructed, the vessel utilized one 8,200 kW and five 5,925 kW auxiliary generators.

== Pirate attack ==
The Elly Maersk is considered to be an impractical target of pirate attacks, in terms of chasing and boarding vessel. On 30 December 2010, the crew of the Elly Maersk reported a suspicious vessel to the UN fleet and 6 suspected pirates were captured by the Danish warship Esbern Snare. The suspected pirates were released on 9 February 2011 due to lack of evidence and returned to the shores of Somalia.

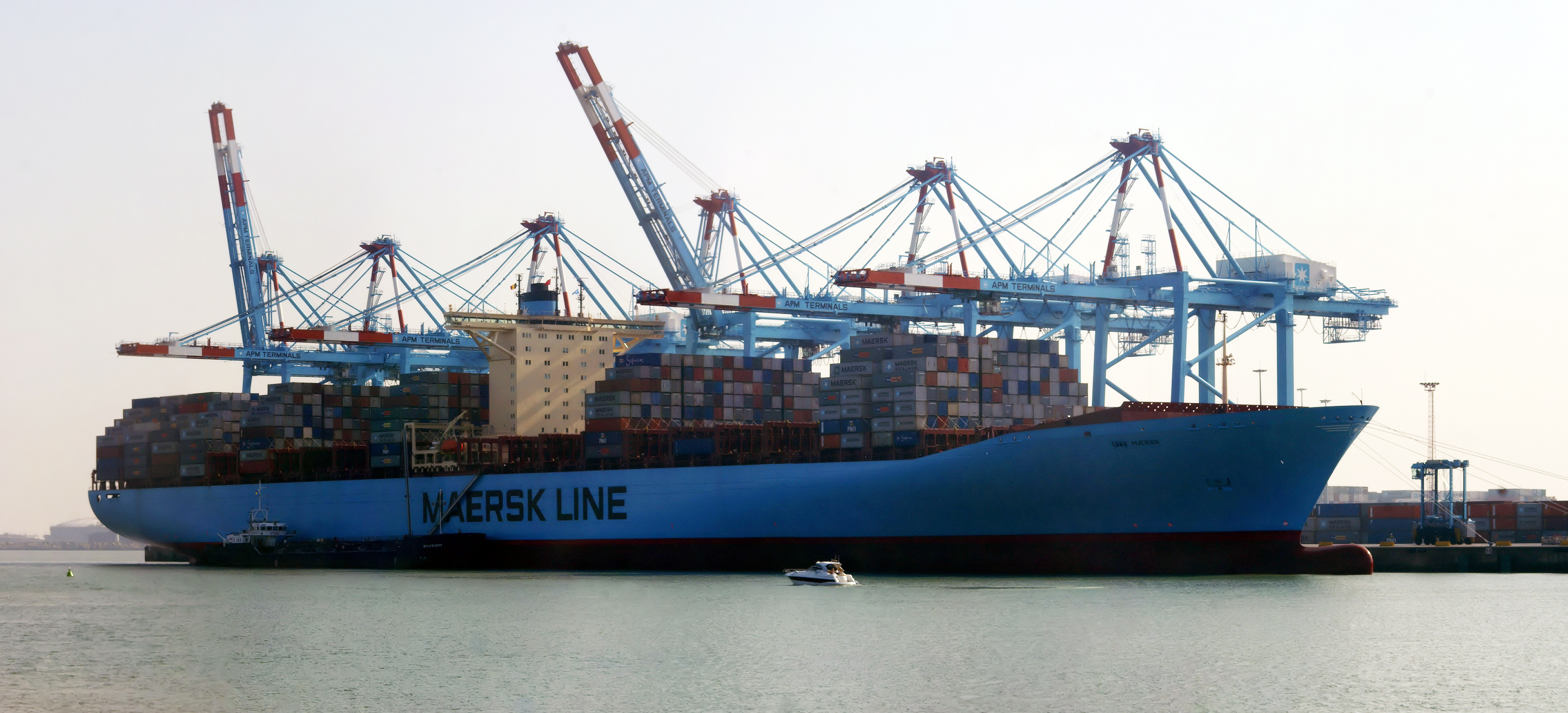
Elly Maersk is seen at Zeebrugge Port.
