= Eleonora Mærsk =

Container ship

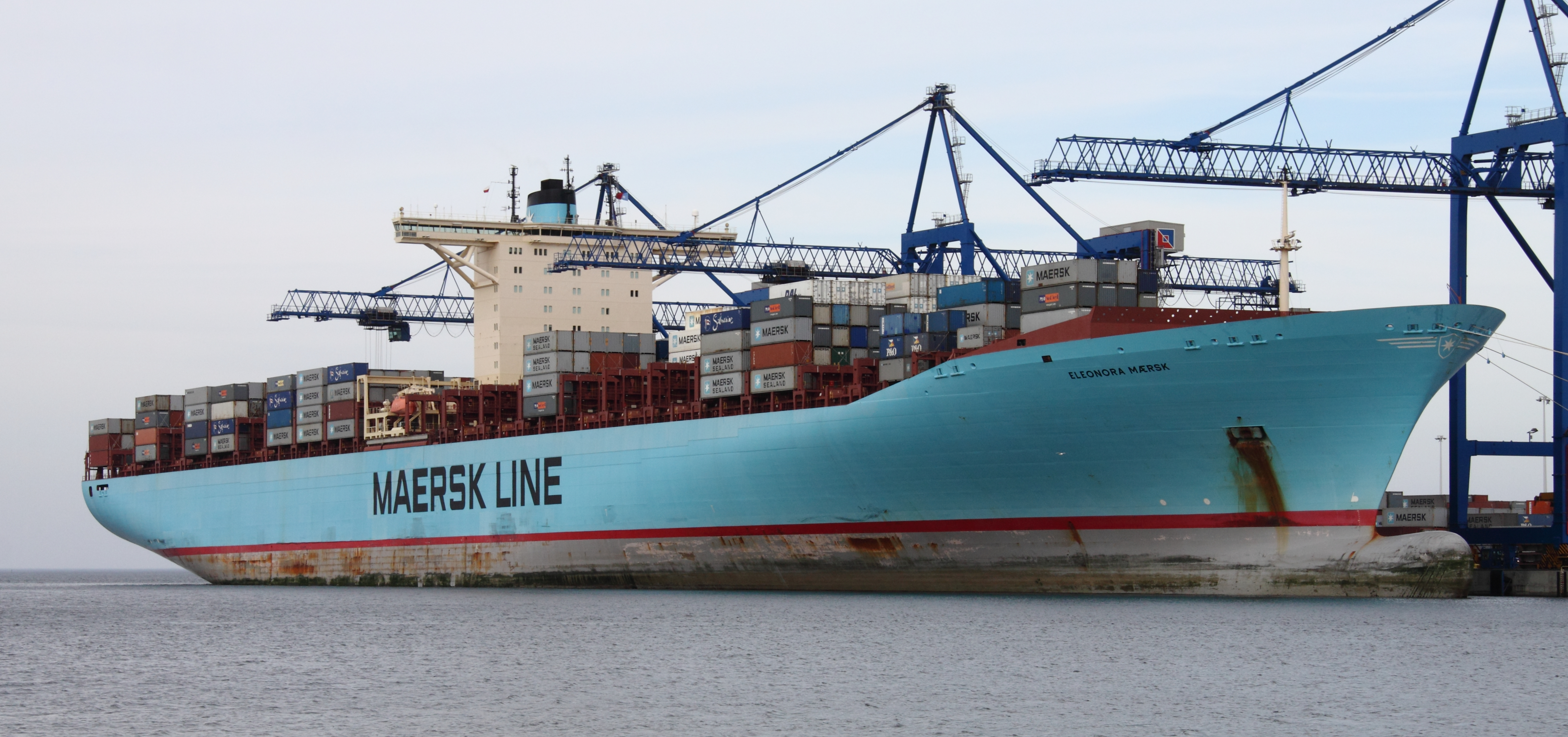

History
- Name: Eleonora Mærsk
- Owner: A.P. Moller-Mærsk group
- Operator: A. P. Moller
- Port of registry: Svendborg, DenmarkDenmark
- Ordered: 2006
- Builder: Odense Steel Shipyard
- Yard number: 205
- Launched: 9 November 2006
- Completed: 12 January 2007
- Identification: IMO number: 9321500; MMSI number: 220477000; Callsign: OVXP2
- Status: In service

General characteristics
- Class & type: E-class container ship
- Tonnage: 170,794 GT
- Length: 397 m (1,302 ft 6 in) (1,302 ft)
- Beam: 56 m (183 ft 9 in)
- Height: 19.4 m (63 ft 8 in)
- Depth: 9.65 m (30 ft 20 in)
- Installed power: 80,905 kW (108,495 hp)
- Propulsion: 1 diesel electric oil engine
- Speed: 27 knots (50 km/h; 31 mph)
- Crew: 13

Eleonora Mærsk is one of the world's largest container ships operated by A. P. Moller and registered to Svendborg, Denmark. It was constructed in 2006 at the Odense Steel Shipyard. There are seven other identical sister ships in the A. P. Moller fleet. Eleonora Mærsk and the other seven ships of the E class are among the biggest ever built.

== Hull and engine ==
Eleonora Mærsk was built by the Odense Steel Shipyard in yard 205. It is a fully cellular container ship with 23 holds, and a total carrying capacity of 15,500 TEU. The ship is 397 m (1,302 ft) long, its beam is 56 m (184 ft) and is 19.4 m (64 ft) high. This ship has a working crew of around 13 people at one time.

The vessel is powered by a Wärtsilä-Sulzer 14RTFLEX96-C diesel engine, capable of producing 80,905 kilowatts (108,495 hp) driving one propeller. This 2-stroke, 14 cylinder engine was built by the Doosan Engine Company in Changwan. When constructed, the vessel utilized one 8,200 kW (11,000 hp) and five 5,925 kW (7,946 hp) auxiliary generators.

== Information ==
Eleonora Mærsk is a sister ship of Emma Maersk and has a maximum speed of 27 knots (50 km/h; 31 mph). The ship was specifically designed to sail through the Asian trade route, and has the largest combustion engine ever built. Its engine is the equivalent of 1,000 family-sized cars.
