= Eugen Mærsk =

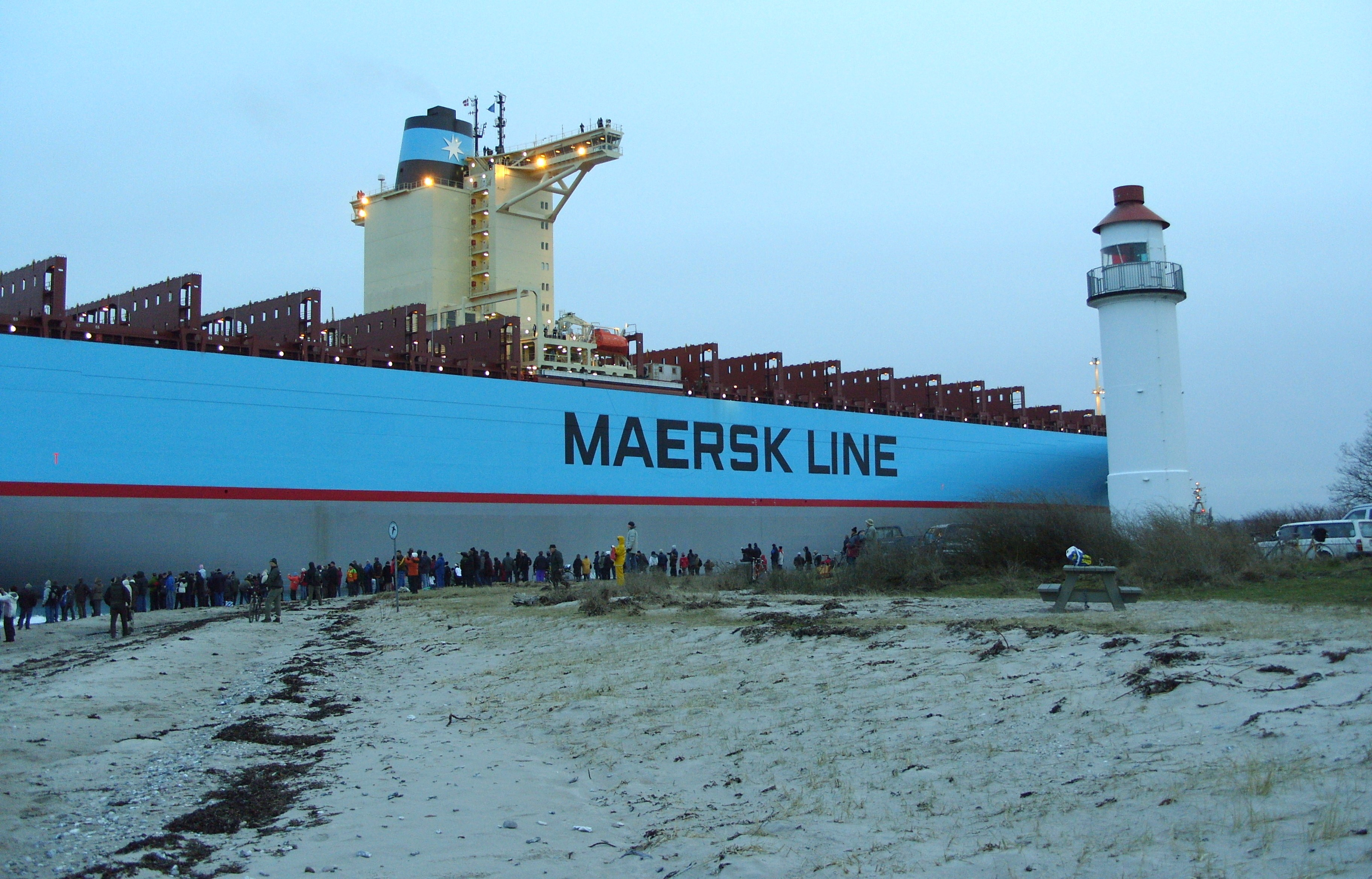
- Eugen Maersk passing the Enebærodde Lighthouse

History
- Name: Eugen Mærsk
- Owner: Maersk
- Operator: Copenhagen, Denmark
- Builder: Odense Steel Shipyard
- Yard number: 210
- Launched: 23 November 2007
- Identification: IMO number: 9321550

General characteristics
- Class & type: Mærsk E-class container ship
- Tonnage: 156,907 DWT
- Length: 1,302 ft (397 m)
- Beam: 183 ft (56 m)

Eugen Maersk is a container ship owned by the Danish shipping company Maersk. The eighth and newest of the Mærsk E-class, built in 2008, she and her seven sister ships are among the largest container ships ever built. She has a total TEU capacity of 11,000 TEU containers; however, with other ratings she can hold 13,500 containers. This rating goes by physical space rather than weight. Her beam is 183 feet (56 m), her length 1,302 feet (397 m), and she has a deadweight tonnage of 156,907.

The construction of this ship was the subject of a television documentary on The Science Channel.

On 19 June 2013, a fire broke out in a container onboard Eugen Maersk.

Summer 2016 Maersk Line to upgrade its eight E-class 15,550 teu vessels to load a further 1,300 teu. Maersk Line is upgrading its eight E-class 15,550 teu vessels to load a further 1,300 teu. Raising the accommodation block and wheelhouse and increasing the height of lashing bridges to take an extra tier of containers is part of the strategy to double the lifetime of the 10-year-old ships, and could be viewed as a statement from Maersk on maximum vessel size intent. Remedial work was needed on the Odense-built ships after the Emma Maersk was fortunate not to sink at the northern entrance to the Suez Canal in early 2013 after the hull was fractured by a failed stern thruster. After the incident, Maersk prohibited the use of stern thrusters on its Emma-class ships until modifications could be made to the fleet. The upgrading, which also includes fitting a new bulbous bow to cope with slower speeds and a new propeller, is being carried out at China's CSIC Qingdao Beihai Shipyard, which has undertaken the majority of previous Maersk Line ship upgrades. It is understood that the first E-class vessel converted was the Eugen Maersk, which has now rejoined the 2M AE1/Shogun Asia-North Europe loop.
