= Evelyn Mærsk =

Container ship built in 2007

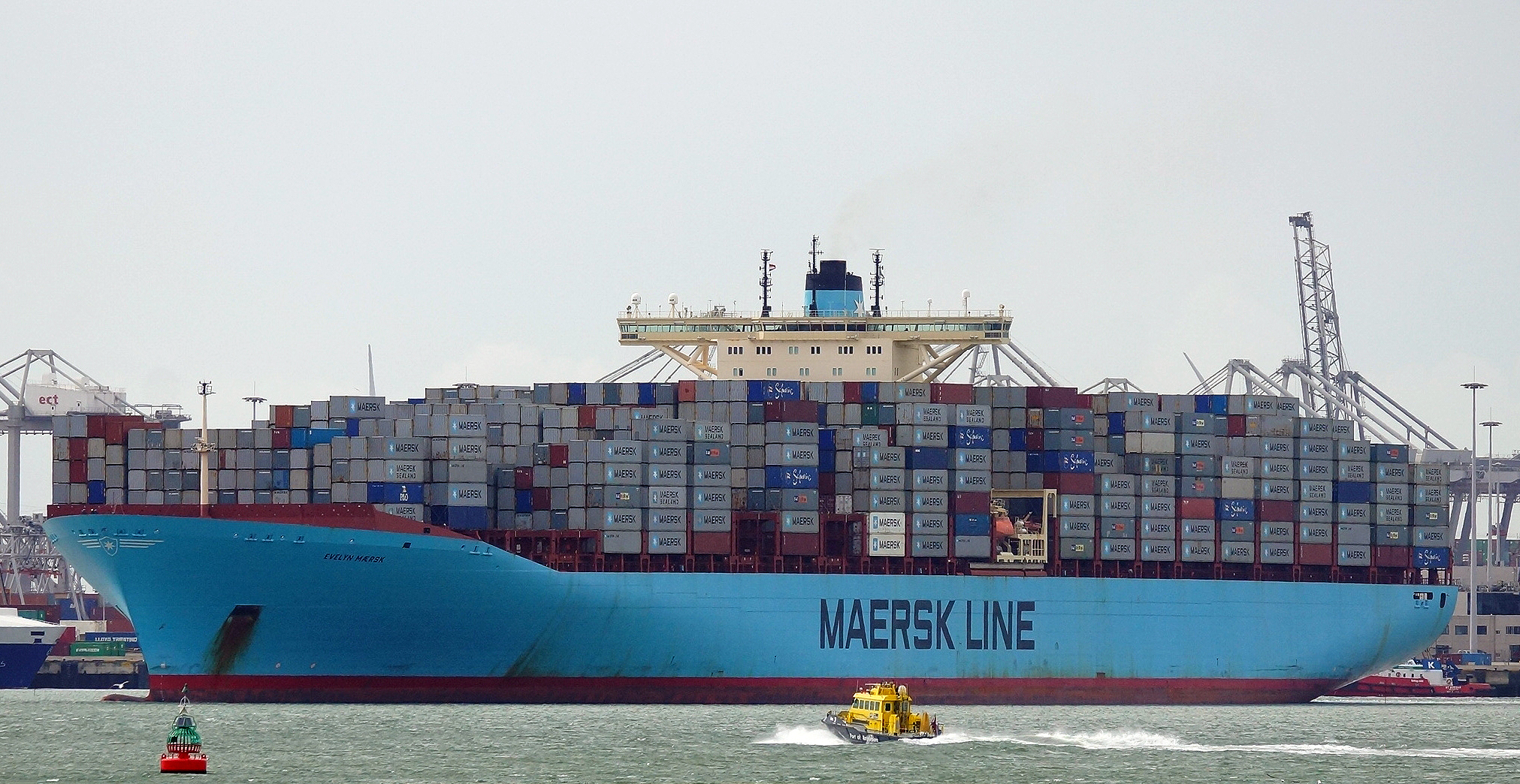

History
- Name: Evelyn Mærsk
- Owner: AP Moller-Maersk A/S
- Operator: AP Moller
- Port of registry: Copenhagen, Denmark
- Builder: Odense Steel Shipyard
- Yard number: 206
- Launched: 30 January 2007
- Completed: March 2007
- Identification: IMO number: 9321512; Call Sign: OXHV2; MMSI: 22049600

General characteristics
- Class & type: Mærsk E-class container ship
- Length: 396 m (1,299 ft)
- Beam: 56 m (184 ft)
- Draught: 16 m (52 ft)
- Depth: 30 m (98 ft)
- Installed power: 80,905 kW (108,495 hp)
- Propulsion: 1 diesel electric oil engine
- Speed: 24.5 knots (45.4 km/h; 28.2 mph)

Evelyn Mærsk is a ship owned and operated by the AP Moller-Maersk Group out of Copenhagen, Denmark.

== Hull and engine ==
The keel was laid in March 2007 at Odense Steel Shipyard. She is 396 metres (1,299 ft) long with a beam of 56 metres (184 ft) and a depth of 30 metres (98 ft). Evelyn Mærsk is powered by a Wärtsilä RT-flex96C diesel electric engine capable of producing 109,998 hp (82,025 kW) with a single fixed pitch propeller and capable of reaching a top speed of 24.5 knots (45.4 km/h; 28.2 mph). The ship can move up to 11,000 containers at one time.

Evelyn Mærsk only requires a 13-man crew.

== Emissions ==
Evelyn Mærsk uses one of the most efficient power plants, using its exhaust heat for boilers and purifying its fuel. Even though the power plants are efficient, Evelyn Mærsk and her sisters have come under scrutiny for burning heavy fuel oil, a black oil that gives off high amounts of sulfur and other pollutants. Although by Ton transporting freight by cargo ship is the least pollutant option, Evelyn Mærsk gives off ten tons of nitrogen oxide per day of running.

== 45,000 tonnes of toys ==
In Autumn of 2010 Evelyn Mærsk restocked Britain and Europe's toy stores with the years best selling toy (Jet Pack Buzz Lightyear). The ship docked in Felixstowe, Suffolk, with a million toys, boardgames, and puzzles brought over from China.

== Saved 352 immigrants off Sicily ==
In August 2014 the container vessel participated into the search and rescue operation for sinking fishing boat with 352 immigrants in Mediterranean Sea off Sicily. After more than 10 hours of searching Evelyn Maersk found the disabled and sinking fishing boat with list of 30 degrees. On board there were 352 immigrants (including 41 children in bad condition) from Syria and the Horn of Africa region. All of them were transported by Evelyn Mærsk to Sicily, where they were hospitalized.
