= E-class container ship =

Class of eight container ships

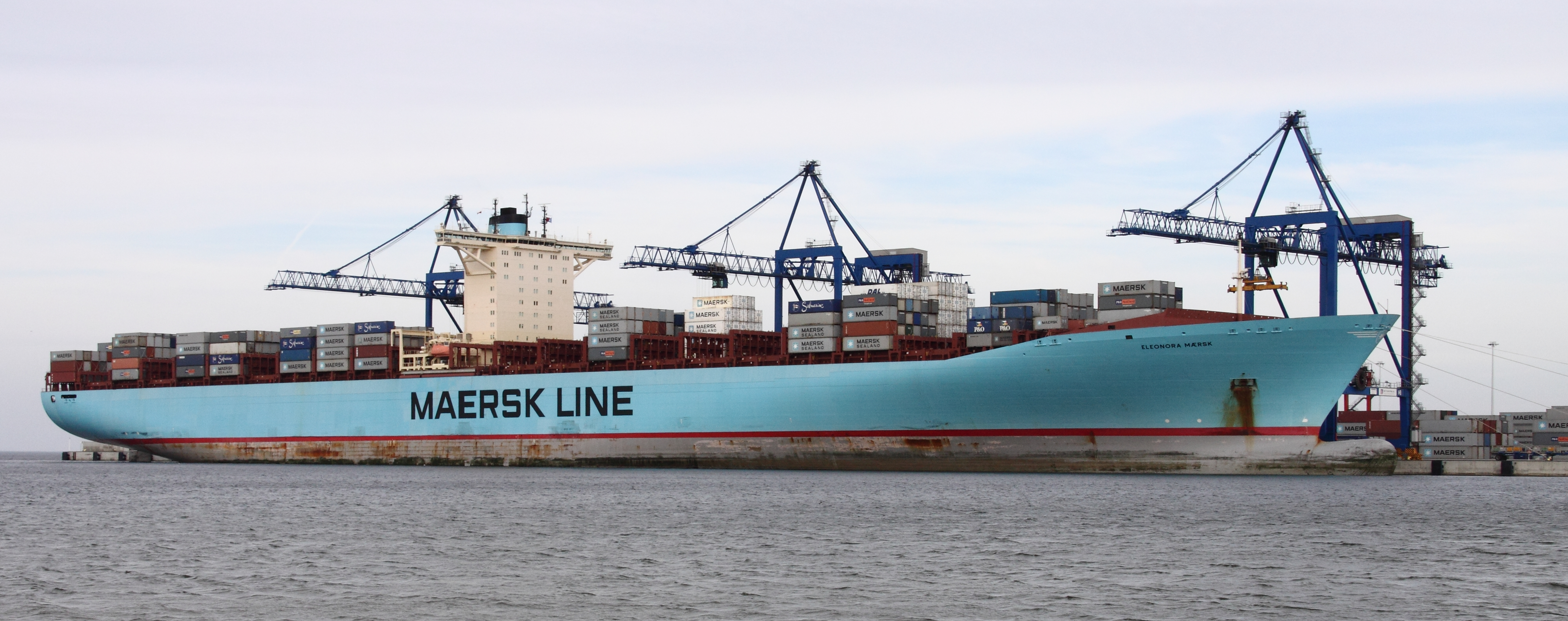
- Eleonora Maersk at Gdańsk Deepwater Container Terminal on 26 May 2011

Class overview
- Builders: Odense Steel Shipyard Ltd.
- Operators: Maersk Line
- Succeeded by: Triple E class
- In service: 8
- Completed: 8

General characteristics
- Type: Container ship
- Tonnage: 171,542 GT; 55,396 NT; 158,200 DWT
- Length: 397.7 m (1,304 ft 9 in)
- Beam: 56.4 m (185 ft 0 in)
- Draught: 15.5 m (50 ft 10 in)
- Depth: 30.2 m (99 ft 1 in) (deck edge to keel)
- Propulsion: 81 MW (109,000 hp) Wärtsilä 14RT-Flex96c plus 30 MW (40,000 hp) from five Caterpillar 8M32
- Speed: 25.5 knots (47.2 km/h; 29.3 mph)
- Capacity: 14,770+ TEU; 1000 TEU (reefers)
- Crew: 13, with room for 30

The E class comprises eight 14,770 twenty-foot equivalent unit (TEU) container ships. Each sister ship bears a name beginning with the letter "E". Until 2012, they were the largest container ship ever constructed, and are among the longest ships currently in use at 398 metres (1,306 ft) long and 56 metres (184 ft) wide. They are owned by the Danish A. P. Moller-Maersk Group. The first in the class built was Emma Maersk by Odense Steel Shipyard Ltd., Denmark. The ships Emma, Estelle, and Eugen were subjects of TV documentaries. The E class was followed by the larger and more fuel efficient Triple E class.

== Capacity upgrade ==
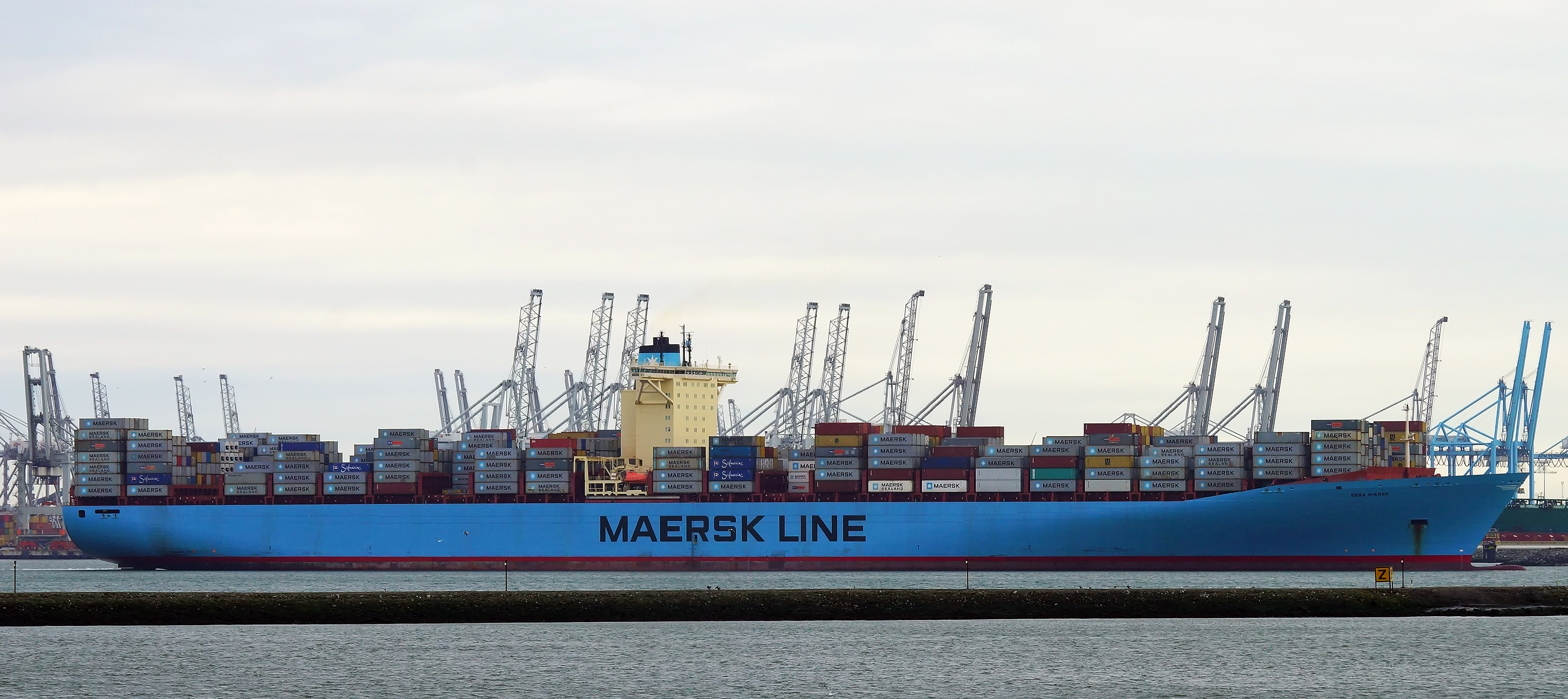
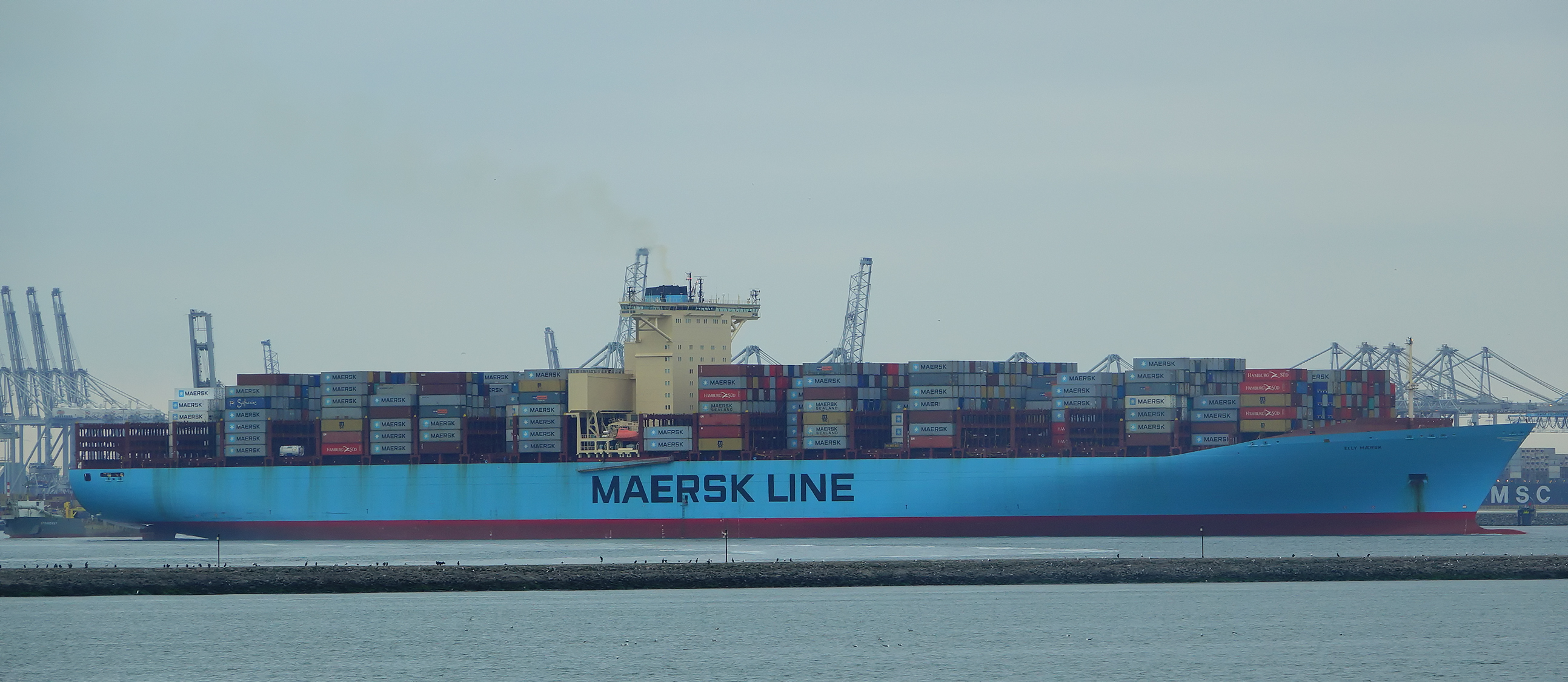
A visual comparison of ships before and after the upgrade

In 2016, the decision was made to upgrade the capacity of the ships and make them more efficient at lower speeds. The capacity increase was done by increasing the height of the lashing bridges and adding an extra floor to the accommodation block. This allows the containers to be stacked higher on deck. To help maintain stability, flume tanks were added on the sides of the accommodation block. The work was carried out at Qingdao Beihai Shipbuilding Heavy Industry's shipyard in China.

== List of ships ==
Ship	Yard number	IMO number	Delivery	Status	ref
Emma Mærsk	L203	9321483	31 Aug 2006	In service	
Estelle Mærsk	L204	9321495	9 Nov 2006	In service	
Eleonora Mærsk	L205	9321500	12 Jan 2007	In service	
Evelyn Mærsk	L206	9321512	29 Mar 2007	In service	
Ebba Mærsk	L207	9321524	15 Jun 2007	In service	
Elly Maersk	L208	9321536	5 Sep 2007	In service	
Edith Mærsk	L209	9321548	14 Nov 2007	In service	
Eugen Mærsk	L210	9321550	29 Jan 2008	In service	

== See also ==
- Maersk Edinburgh-class container ship
