= Ebba Mærsk =

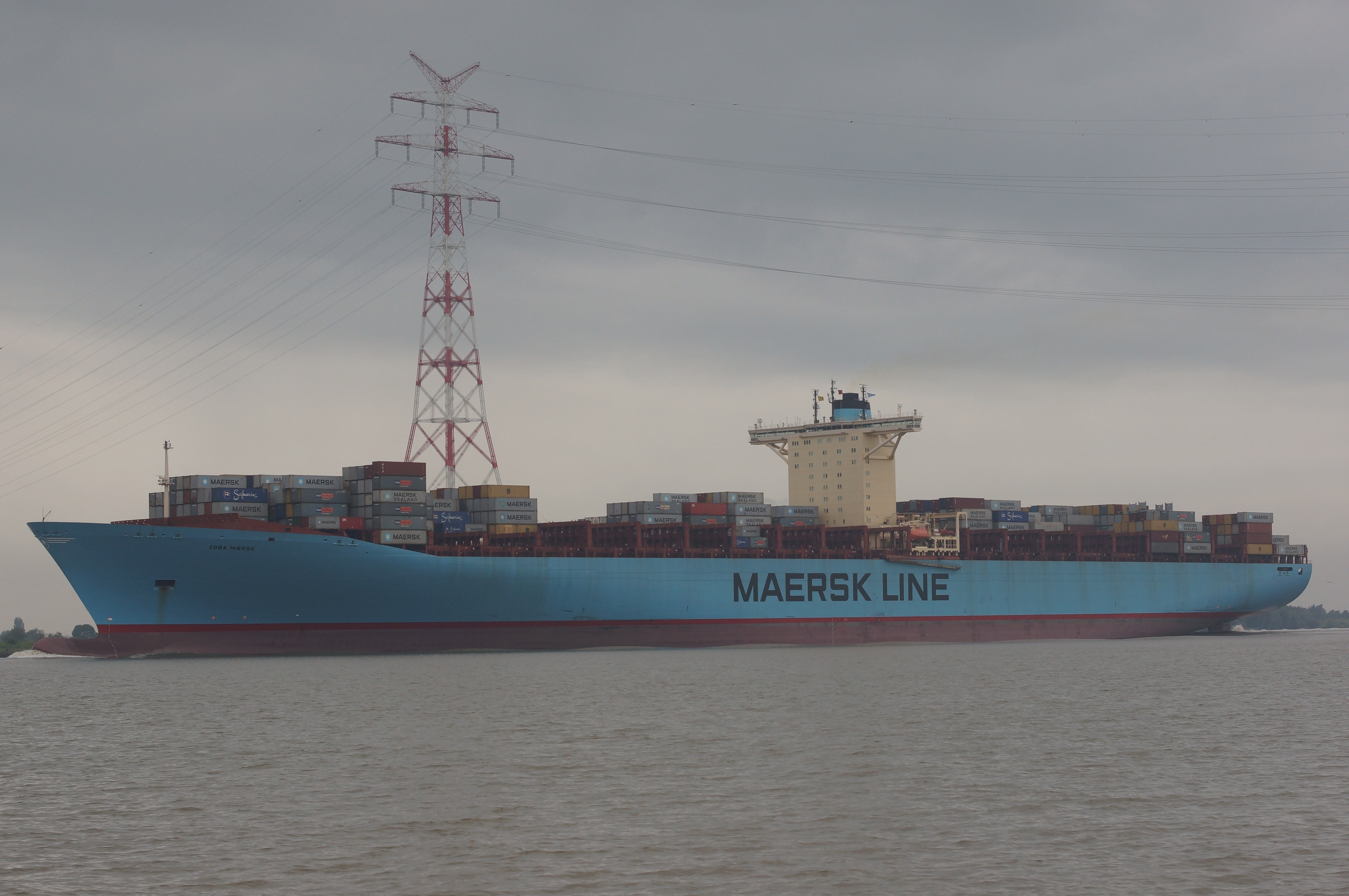
- Ebba Mærsk heading Hamburg. In the background the southern suspension tower of Elbe crossing 2.

History
- Name: Ebba Mærsk
- Owner: A. P. Moller-Maersk Group
- Operator: Copenhagen, Denmark
- Builder: Odense Steel Shipyard
- Yard number: 207
- Launched: 12 April 2007
- Christened: 21 May 2007
- Identification: IMO number: 9321524

General characteristics
- Class & type: Mærsk E-class container ship
- Tonnage: 156,907 DWT
- Length: 397 m (1,302 ft)
- Beam: 56 m (184 ft)

Ebba Mærsk is a container ship owned by the Danish shipping company A. P. Moller-Maersk Group. She is the fifth of the Mærsk E-class, and at the time of delivery she and her seven sister ships were among the largest container ships ever built. She has a total TEU capacity of 11,000 TEU 14-ton containers by Mærsk definition; however, with standard ratings she can hold 14,770 containers. This rating goes by physical space rather than weight. Her beam is 56 m (184 ft), her length 397 m (1,302 ft), and she has a deadweight tonnage of 156,907. In May 2010, she was reported with 15,011 TEU in Tangier, Morocco, the highest equivalent number of any vessel.

== In popular culture ==
In the Daniel Suarez novel Kill Decision, Ebba Mærsk is taken over by thousands of automated combat drones hidden in shipping containers.
