= Emma Mærsk =

Container ship

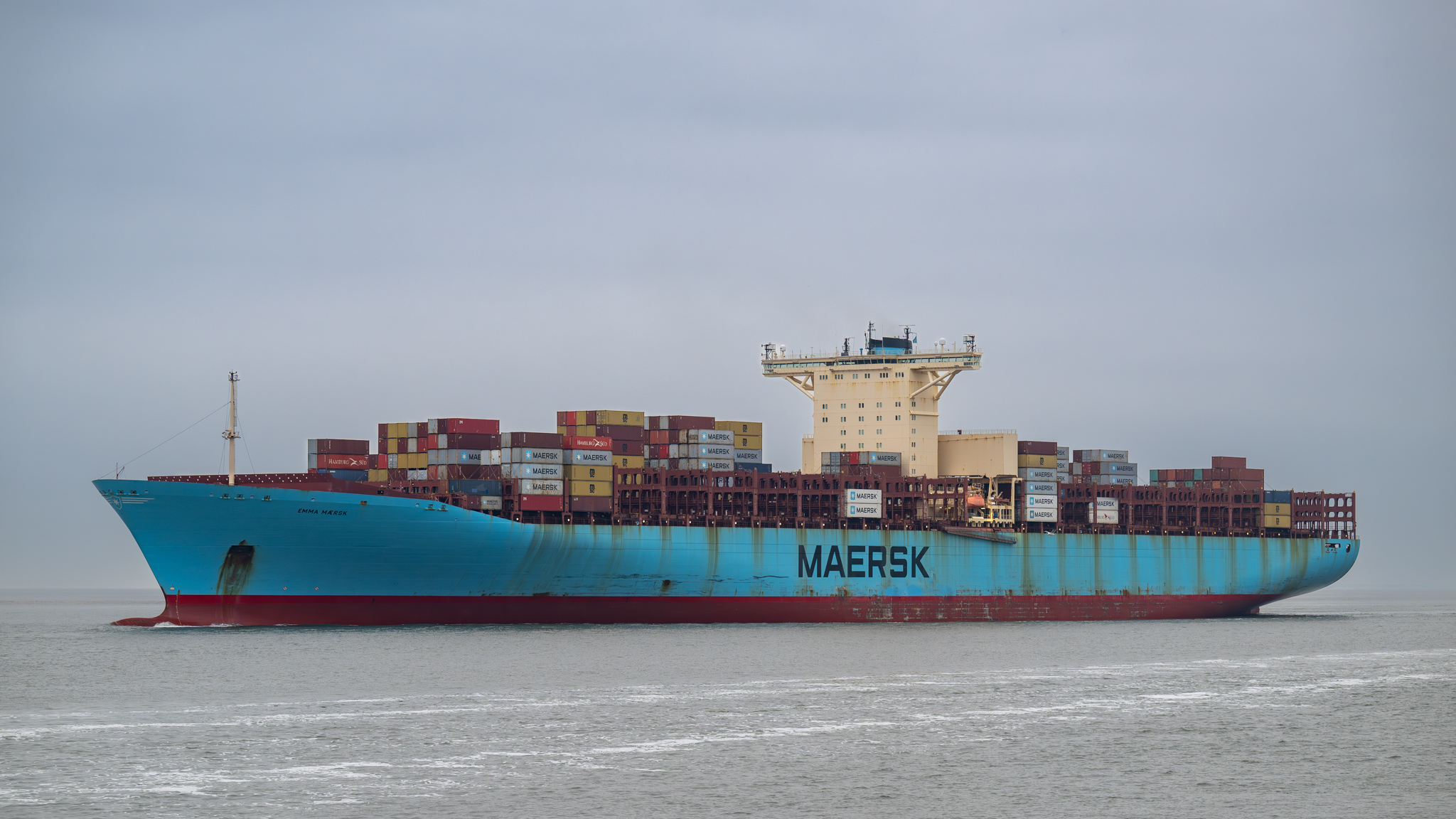
- Container ship Emma Mærsk, 1 October 2023
- Name: Emma Mærsk
- Owner: Moller-Maersk
- Operator: A. P. Moller-Maersk Group
- Port of registry: Taarbæk, Denmark
- Builder: Odense Steel Shipyard Ltd., Denmark
- Laid down: 20 January 2006
- Launched: 18 May 2006
- Acquired: 31 August 2006
- In service: 31 August 2006
- Identification: ABS class no: 06151181; Call sign: OYGR2; IMO number: 9321483; MMSI number: 220417000
- Status: In service

General characteristics
- Class & type: E-class container ship
- Tonnage: 170,794 GT; 55,396 NT; 156,907 DWT
- Length: 397 m (1,302 ft 6 in)
- Beam: 56 m (183 ft 9 in)
- Draught: 16.02 m (52 ft 7 in)
- Depth: 30 m (98 ft 5 in) (deck edge to keel)
- Propulsion: 80.08 MW (107,390 hp) Wärtsilä 14RT-Flex96c plus 30 MW (40,000 hp) from five Caterpillar 9M32
- Speed: 25.5 knots (47.2 km/h; 29.3 mph)
- Capacity: 14,770+ TEU; 1000 TEU (reefers)
- Crew: 13, with room for 30

Emma Mærsk is the first container ship in the E class of eight owned by A.P. Møller – Mærsk A/S. When launched in 2006, she was the largest container ship ever built, and in 2010, she and her seven sister ships were among the longest container ships. Officially, she is able to carry around 11,000 twenty-foot equivalent units (TEU) or 14,770 TEU, depending on definition. In May 2010, her sister ship Ebba Mærsk set a record of 15,011 TEU in Tanger-Med, Tangier.

== History ==
Emma Mærsk was built at the Odense Steel Shipyard in Denmark. In June 2006, during construction, welding work caused a fire within the superstructure. It spread rapidly through the accommodation section and bridge, which delayed her completion by six to seven weeks.

She was named in a ceremony on 12 August 2006, after Mærsk Mc-Kinney Møller's late wife, Emma. On 16 August 2006, five tugboats dragged Emma Mærsk from her Danish shipyard and towed her backward to the sea. She set sail on her maiden voyage on 8 September 2006 at 02:00 hours from Aarhus, calling at Gothenburg, Bremerhaven, Rotterdam, Algeciras, the Suez Canal, and arrived in Singapore on 1 October 2006 at 20:05 hours. She sailed the next day for Yantian in Shenzhen, then Kobe, Nagoya, arriving at Yokohama on 10 October 2006, and returning via Shenzhen, Hong Kong, Tanjung Pelepas, the Suez Canal, Felixstowe, Rotterdam, Bremerhaven, Gothenburg to Aarhus, arriving on 11 November 2006 at 16:00 hours.

In 2008, the ship was featured on an episode of the television documentary series Mighty Ships, during a voyage between Malaysia and Spain.

In 2011, the National Bank of Denmark issued a 20 DKK commemorative coin for her.

Going eastwards on 1 February 2013, she suffered a damaged stern thruster and took on so much water in the Suez Canal that she became unmaneuverable. Tugs, anchors and the wind took her to Port Said to offload 13,500 containers, drain her and be investigated by divers. She had not been in danger of sinking.

On 15 February 2013, the Maersk Line confirmed that she was about to leave Port Said under tow to a yard for further assessment and repair. On 25 February she reached the yard of Palermo, Sicily, where she was scheduled to stay for four months. The flooded engine was disassembled, repaired and assembled, and in August 2013, she was in service again after a DKK 250 million (roughly US$44.5 million) repair.

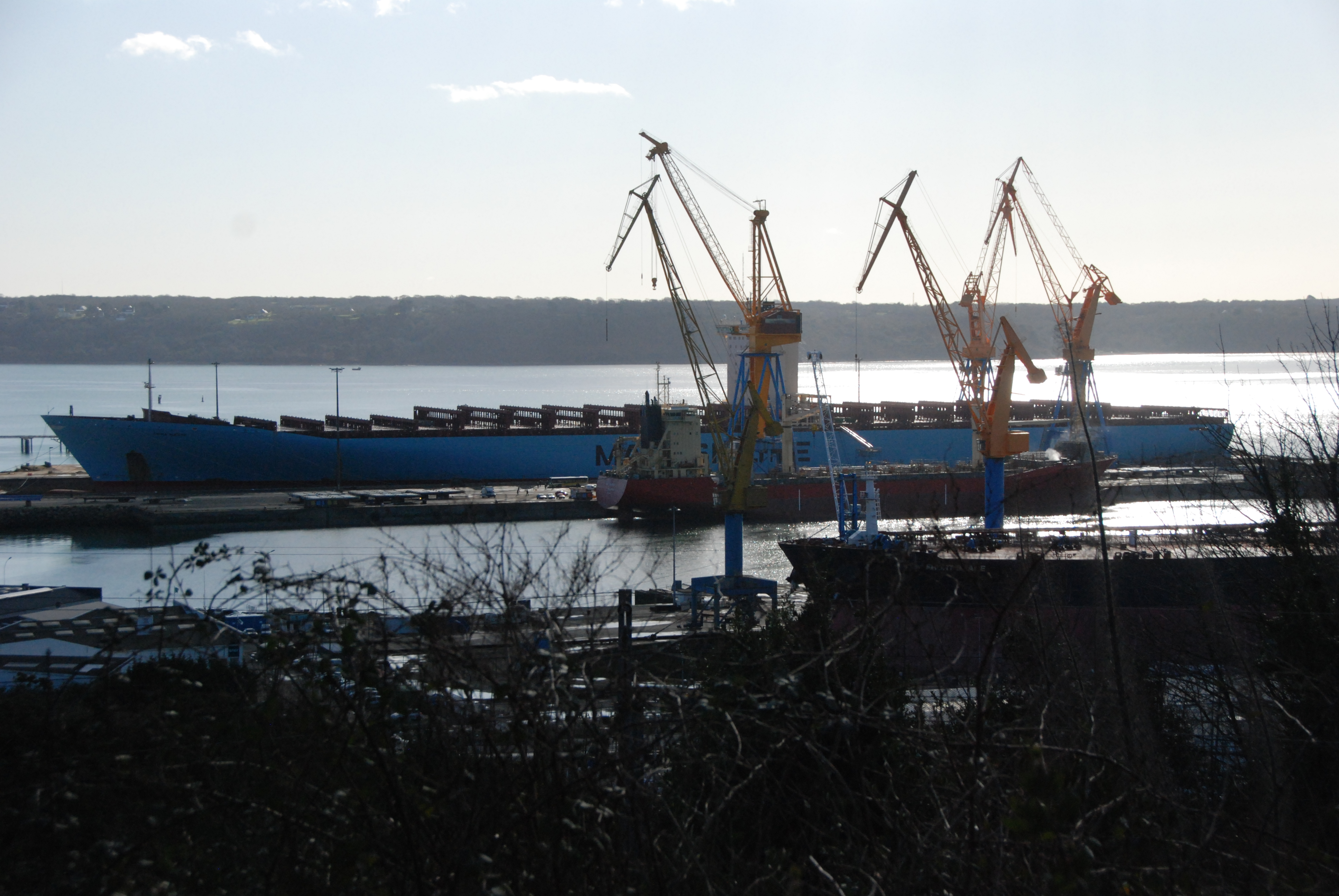
Emma Mærsk at a shipyard in Brest, France

== Capacity ==
Originally Maersk reported a capacity of 11,000 TEU (twenty-foot equivalent units) as the maximum capacity of fully loaded 14 ton containers, according to Maersk company's then method of calculating capacity, which, at her introduction into service, was about 1,400 more containers than any other ship. However, Maersk also acknowledges the standard method of defining capacity, stating 14,770 TEU.

By normal calculations, she has a capacity significantly greater than reported—between 13,500 and 15,200 TEU. The difference between the official and estimated numbers is because Maersk calculates the capacity of a container ship by weight (in this case, 14 tons/container), i.e. 11,000+ containers, of which 1,000 can be refrigerated containers.

Most companies calculate capacity according to the maximum number of containers that can be carried irrespective of weight. This is called a twenty-foot equivalent unit, or TEU. As of 2012, the E class is still the largest by full-weight 14-tonne capacity. Marco Polo can carry 10,000 14 t containers, 16,020 if not fully loaded.

On 21 February 2011, Maersk ordered a family of ten even larger ships from Daewoo, the Triple E class, with a capacity of 18,000 containers. A further ten ships were ordered in June 2011. The first was delivered in 2013.

== Engine and hull ==
She is powered by a Wärtsilä-Sulzer 14RTFLEX96-C straight-14 engine, the world's largest single diesel unit, weighing 2,300 tonnes and capable of 81 MW (109,000 hp) when burning 14,000 litres (3,600 US gal) of heavy fuel oil per hour.

At economical speed, fuel consumption is 0.260 bs/hp·hour (6,284 L/hour). She has features to lower environmental damage, including exhaust heat recovery and cogeneration. Some of the exhaust gases are returned to the engine to improve economy and lower emissions, and some are passed through a steam generator which then powers a Peter Brotherhood steam turbine and electrical generators. This creates an electrical output of 8.5 MW, equivalent to about 12% of the main engine power output. Some of this steam is used directly as shipboard heat. Five diesel generators together produce 20.8 MW, giving a total electric output of 29 MW. Two 9 MW electric motors augment the power on the 150 meter main propeller shaft, the longest in the world.

Two bow and two stern thrusters provide port manoeuvrability, and two pairs of stabilizer fins reduce rolling. A special silicone-based paint, instead of biocides used by much of the industry, keeps barnacles off the hull. This increases her efficiency by reducing drag while also protecting the ocean from biocides that may leak. The paint is credited with lowering the water drag enough to save 1,200 tonnes of fuel per year. The ship has a bulbous bow, a standard feature for cargo ships as it further reduces drag.

The turning diameter at 44 km/h (24 knots) is 1.50 km (0.81 nmi). The engine is near midship to make best use of the rigidity of the hull and to maximize capacity. When the ship rolls 20 degrees, the bridge sways 35 metres. The ship's anchors weigh 29 tons each and each chain-link weighs 200 kg.

== Sailing schedules ==
Her regular round trip is between northern Europe and the far east via the English Channel, the Strait of Gibraltar and the Suez Canal, calling at Ningbo, Xiamen, Hong Kong (westbound), Yantian (westbound), Algeciras (westbound), Rotterdam, Bremerhaven, Algeciras (eastbound), Yantian (eastbound), Hong Kong (eastbound), and Ningbo.

As of April 2011, the schedule included Gdańsk, Aarhus, and Gothenburg.
