= Madison Maersk =

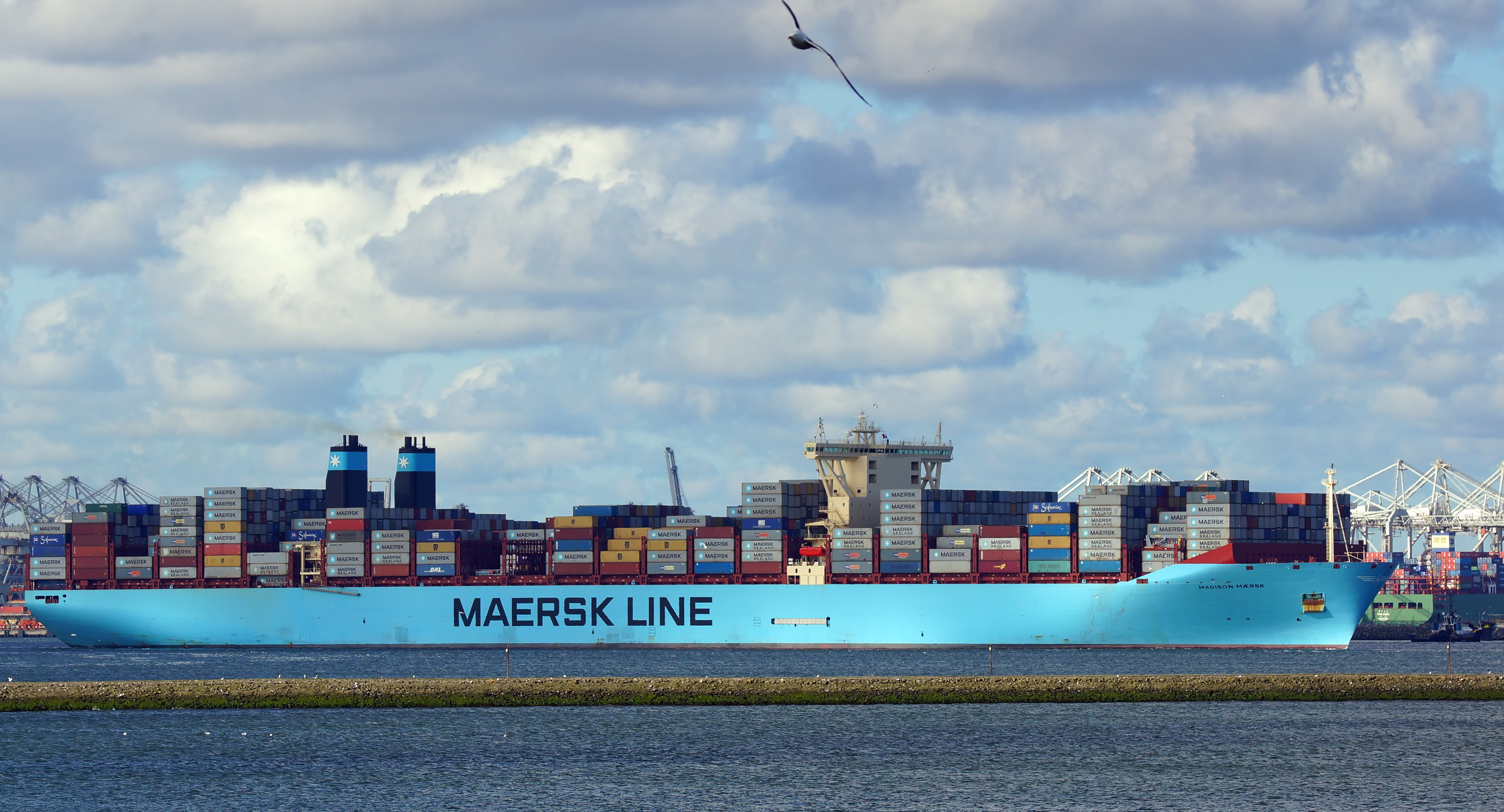
- Madison Maersk

History

Denmark
- Name: Madison Maersk
- Operator: Ap Moller Maersk
- Port of registry: Denmark
- Builder: Daewoo Shipbuilding
- Launched: 29 June 2013
- Identification: Call sign: OWJG2; IMO number: 9619945; MMSI number: 219018864
- Status: In active service

General characteristics
- Type: Container Ship
- Tonnage: 194,849 GT; 194,394 DWT
- Length: 400 m (1,300 ft)
- Beam: 59 m (194 ft)
- Draught: 15.5 m (51 ft)
- Installed power: 59,360 kW
- Propulsion: MAN Diesel & Turbo 8S80ME-C 9.2
- Speed: 22.0 knots (41 km/h) (maximum); 16.0 knots (30 km/h) (cruising)
- Capacity: 18,270 TEU
- Crew: 20

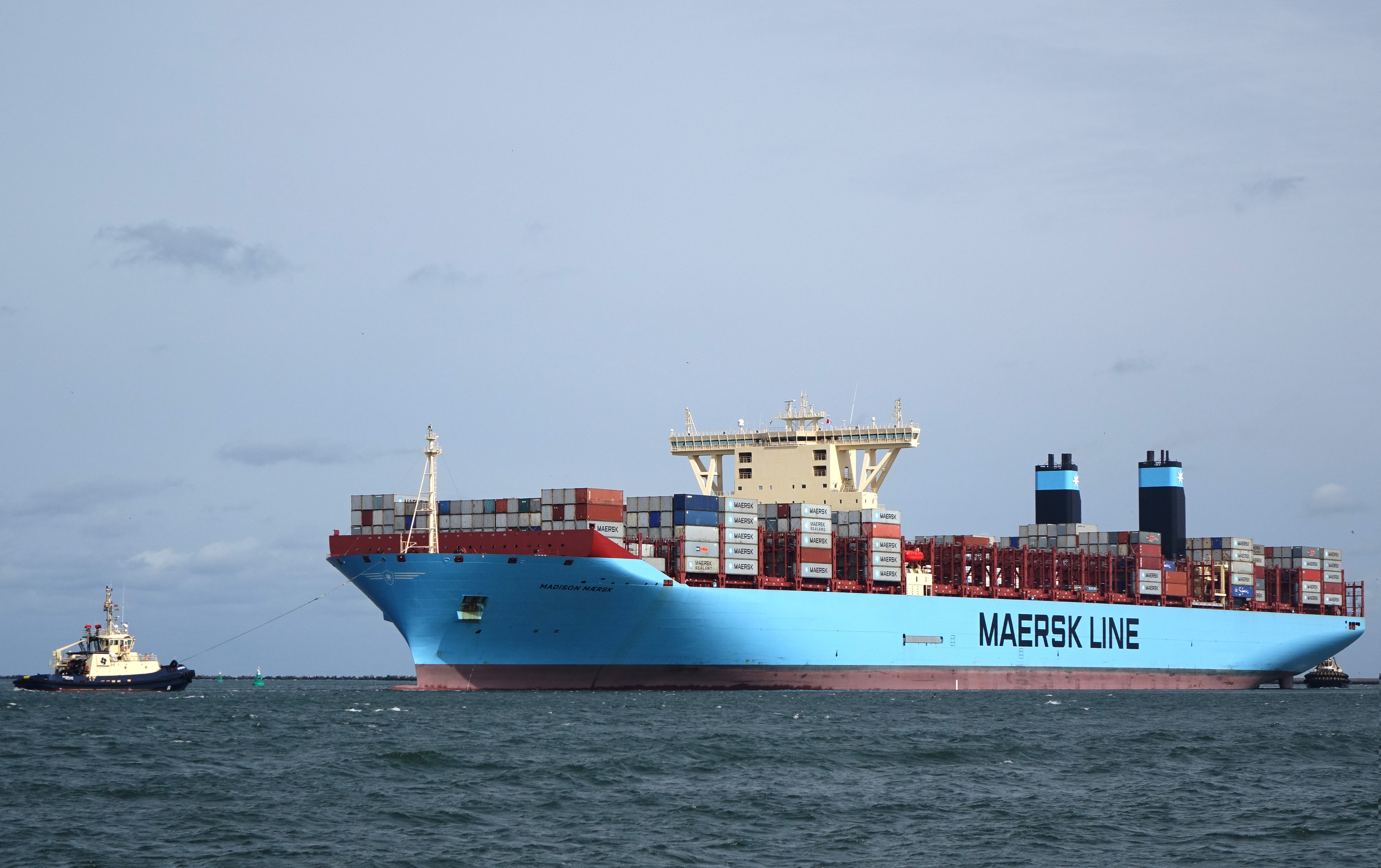
Madison Maersk

Madison Maersk is one of the largest very large container vessels (VLCV) in the world. The ship is Maersk Triple E class and was built in 2014 by Daewoo Shipbuilding & Marine Engineering in South Korea. The ship was ordered together with her sister ships Magleby Maersk, Maribo Maersk, Marstal Maersk, Matz Maersk and Mayview Maersk. With improved architecture and more powerful engineering and propulsion system, the ship achieves better dynamic characteristics and lower fuel consumption. The ship has capacity for 18,270 TEU and is accommodated with 1,800 reefer plugs.

== Design ==
Madison Maersk has overall length of 398 m (1,306 ft), moulded beam of 59 m (194 ft) and maximum summer draft of 16 m (52 ft). The height from the keel to the top of the mast is 73 m (240 ft) and the board depth is 33 m (108 ft). With such dimensions the VLCV has deadweight of 194,394 DWT, gross tonnage of 194,849 GT and maximum cargo capacity of 18,270 TEU. Madison Maersk has Class ✠A1, Container Carrier, HIMP, ✠AMS, ✠ACCU, MAN-A, NBLES, TCM, FL 25, SH, SH-DLA, BWT+, ENVIRO +, GP, SHCM and is classified by American Bureau Of Shipping.

== Engineering ==
The very large container vessel Madison Maersk is equipped with two 8-cylinder ultra long-stroke engines MAN B&W 8S80ME-C 9.2 with total output power of 59,360 kW. The engines are designed for slow speed of 16.0 knots (30 km/h) and has reduced fuel consumption at that speed. The maximum achieved speed during the trial tests is 22.0 knots (41 km/h).

== See also ==
- List of largest container ships
- CSCL Globe
