= Mærsk Mc-Kinney Møller =

Danish shipping magnate (1913–2012)

His Excellency Mærsk Mc-Kinney Møller RE SK CBE SMM
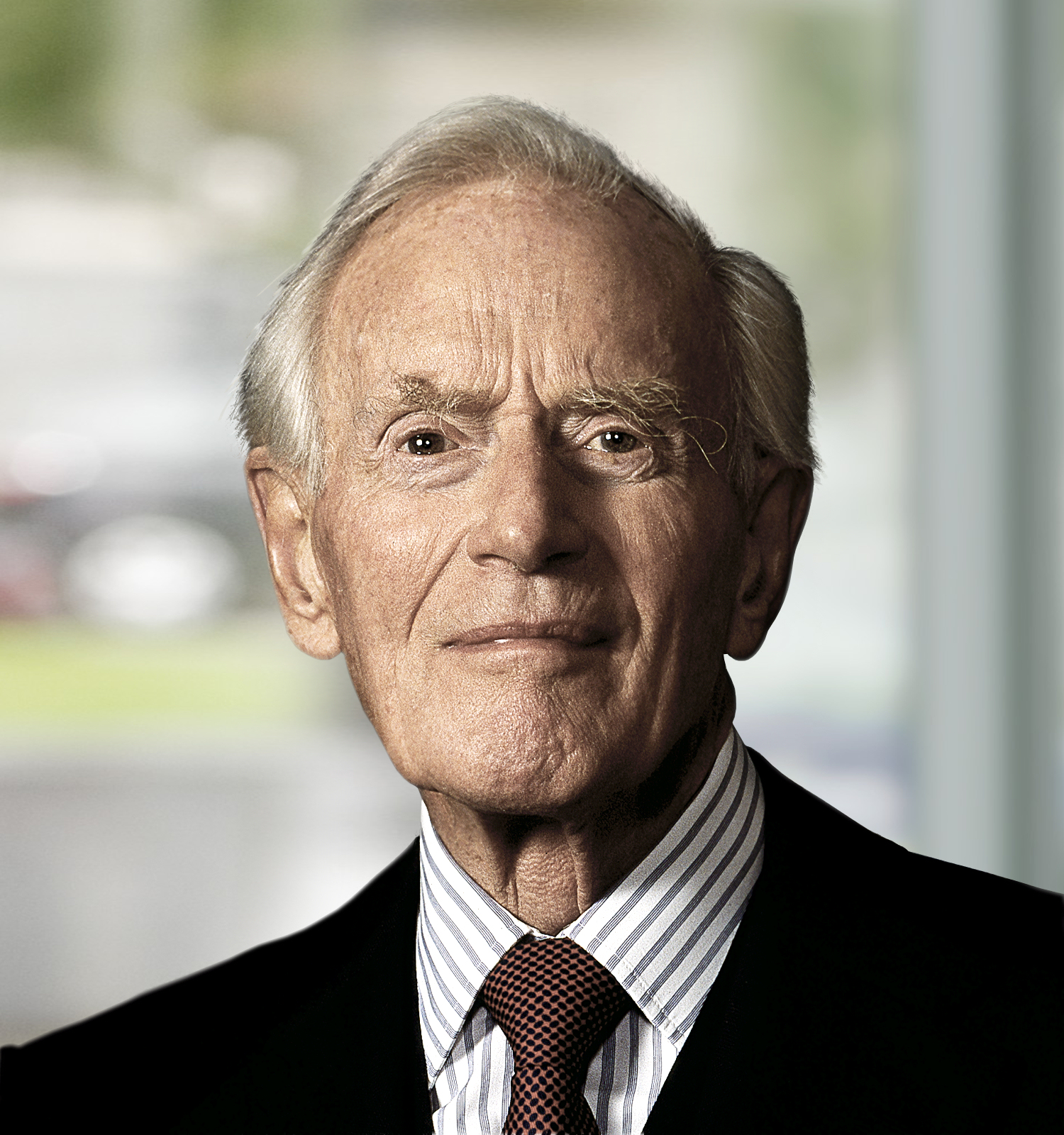
- Born: Arnold Mærsk Mc-Kinney Møller; 13 July 1913; Hellerup, Denmark
- Died: 16 April 2012 (aged 98); Copenhagen, Denmark
- Occupation: Shipping
- Spouse: Emma Mc-Kinney Møller
- Children: 3
- Parent(s): Arnold Peter and Chastine Estelle Roberta (née McKinney) Møller
- Awards: Life Honorary Member of the Baltic Exchange

Arnold Mærsk Mc-Kinney Møller (Danish: [ˈmɛɐ̯sk məˈkʰini ˈmølˀɐ]; 13 July 1913 – 16 April 2012) was a Danish shipping magnate. He was a longtime figure at A.P. Moller–Maersk Group, which was founded by his father.

== Personal life ==
Mærsk Mc-Kinney Møller was born in Hellerup, the son of a Danish father, Arnold Peter Møller, founder of the A.P. Moller–Maersk Group and an American mother of Irish and German descent, Chastine Estelle Roberta (née McKinney) Møller. Mærsk married his high-school sweetheart, Emma Neergaard Rasmussen in 1940 and remained married to her until her death in 2005. They had three daughters: Leise (born 1941), Kirsten, Mrs Olufsen (born 1944), and Ane, Mrs Uggla (born 1948). He ranked 557th-wealthiest person in the world (2007) on the Forbes list with an estimated fortune of 142 billion Danish kroner, which made him the wealthiest person in Denmark until his death.

== Business activities ==
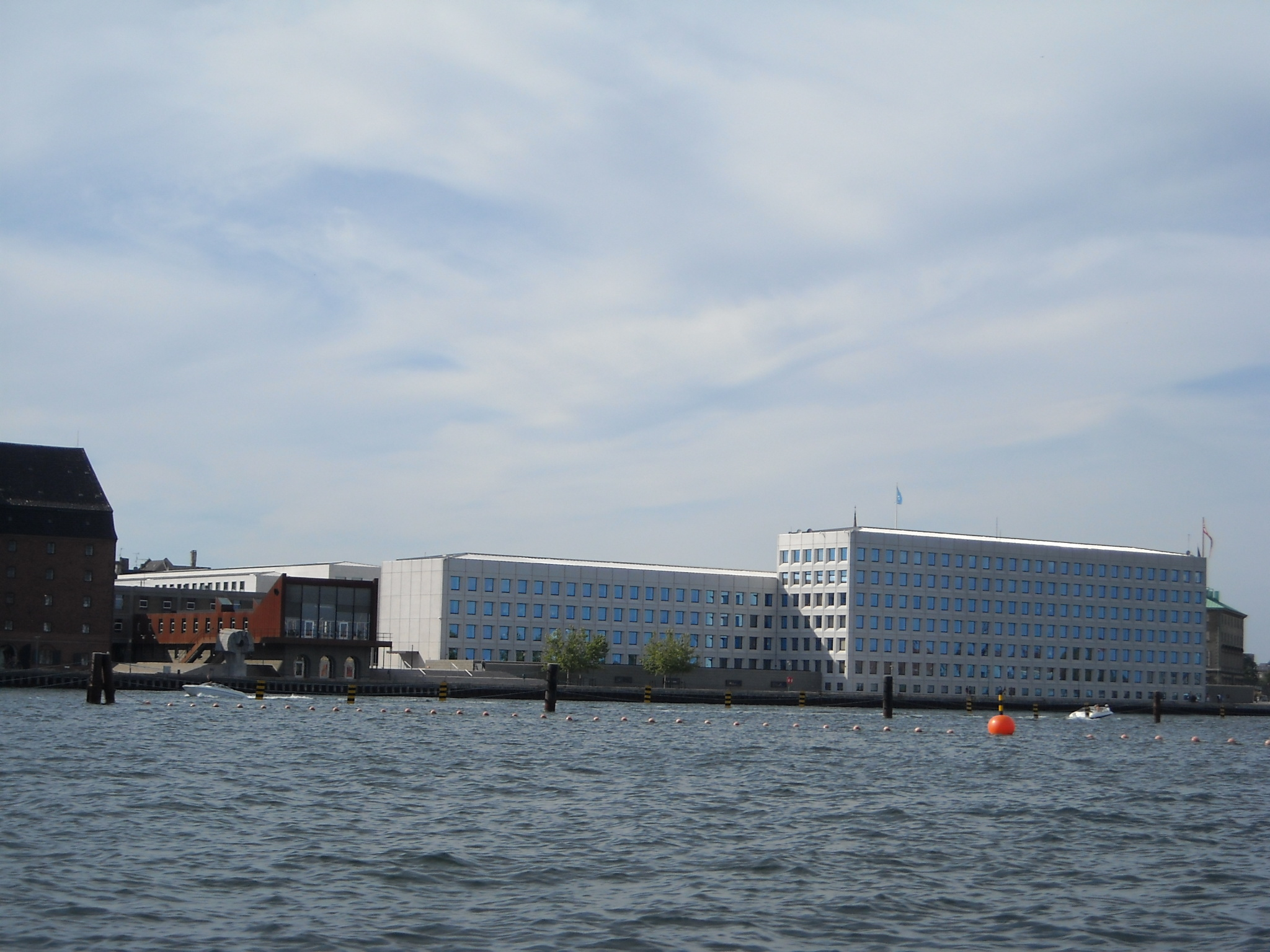
A.P. Møller – Mærsk headquarters at Nordre Toldbod in Copenhagen harbour

Møller became a partner in the A.P. Moller–Maersk Group in 1940. When Denmark was occupied by Germany during World War II Møller went into exile in the United States and ran the family business from New York until his return to Denmark in 1947. Møller became CEO and chairman on his father's death in 1965. In 1970, Møller became the first non-American member of the board of IBM, a position he held until 1984.

Møller stepped down as CEO in 1993 in favour of Jess Søderberg, but stayed on as chairman of the board until 2003 when, at age 90, he retired completely. He personally controlled a substantial portion of the company's shares until his death. At his death he was Denmark's second-richest man after Kjeld Kirk Kristiansen, according to the Forbes List of Billionaires 2007. This is disputed by the Danish financial magazine Berlingske Nyhedsmagasin, which placed Møller as number one in Denmark and estimated his fortune in 2006 as 141.2 billion DKK, and his personal wealth at 7.0 billion DKK. Most of Møller's fortune was placed in foundations controlling the A.P. Moller–Maersk Group, in which he held a controlling interest.

=== North Sea oil ===
In 1962, A.P. Møller–Maersk A/S was granted concession to survey and exploit oil and natural gas resources in Denmark, rendering a monopoly-like status to Maersk. The 40-year agreement was renewed in 2003, causing some discussion. The levy paid to the state is not influenced by fluctuating oil price, meaning Maersk could gain a much larger profit in times with high oil prices. The levy is 69 percent, lower than Norway's (80 percent). The UK raised the oil levy in 2006 due to high prices. As of November 2007, the price of oil had risen from US$22 to $96 per barrel, since the agreement of 2003, meaning that in 40 years' time, the company would not just earn the expected profit of 87 billion kroner, but 346 billion kroner, overall. Government parties declined to change the agreement or raise the oil levy. The oil and gas was reclaimed by Mærsks Olie og Gas A/S and Dansk Undergrunds Consortium (DUC), owned by A.P. Møller–Maersk A/S (39%), a subcompany of Royal Dutch Shell (46%) and Chevron Denmark Inc. (15%).

The company is a major contributor to the Conservative People's Party and Venstre, the two parties forming Denmark's governing coalition from 2001 to 2011. Smaller contributions have been paid to other political parties, including the Danish Social Liberal Party, Danish People's Party, and formerly the Centre Democrats and the Progress Party.

=== Succession ===
Upon his death, his youngest daughter Ane Mærsk Mc-Kinney Uggla took over as chairperson of the controlling foundation of Maersk, and announced a plan to keep the organization mostly the same as a conglomerate of loosely-related businesses.

== Philanthropy ==
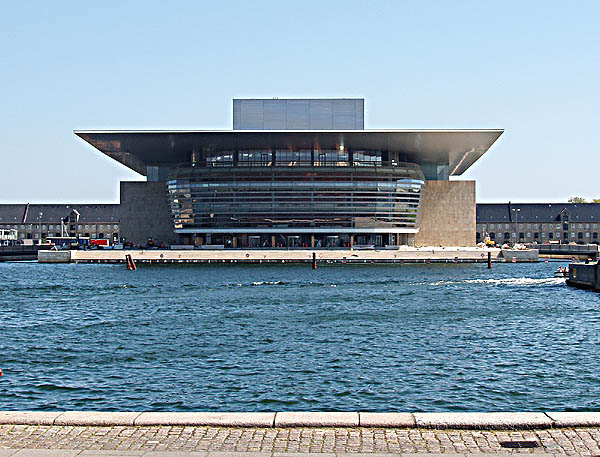
The Copenhagen Opera at the harbour

The Copenhagen Opera House, at a cost of 2.3 billion kroner, is one of the most expensive opera houses ever built; it was donated by The A.P. Møller and Chastine Mc-Kinney Møller Foundation. It is situated directly across the harbour from the royal residence, Amalienborg Palace, and within sight of his Maersk headquarters. In the same area, Møller donated Amaliehaven, a park between the Palace and the harbour, in the 1980s.

== Death ==
Møller died on 16 April 2012, aged 98, just four days after his last public appearance. He was survived by his three daughters.

== Distinctions and accolades ==
Møller was a knight of the Danish Order of the Elephant (awarded 15 December 2000); he was, during his membership of the order, the only person who was neither royal nor a head of state to hold this honour (the nuclear physicist Niels Bohr and founder of the East Asiatic Company Hans Niels Andersen held the same order), which granted him the title His Excellency. He was awarded the honour of Life Honorary Membership of the Baltic Exchange in recognition of his service to shipping by the Baltic. AP Møller-Maersk has conducted business through Baltic Exchange brokers since the early 20th century and its London company has been a Baltic member since 1951.

The Maersk 2013, a new Triple E-class container ship (165,000 metric tons deadweight), IMO:9619907, yard number 4250, ship name Mærsk Mc-Kinney Møller, was named for Mærsk Mc-Kinney Møller.

Coat of Arms of Arnold Mærsk Mc-Kinney Møller
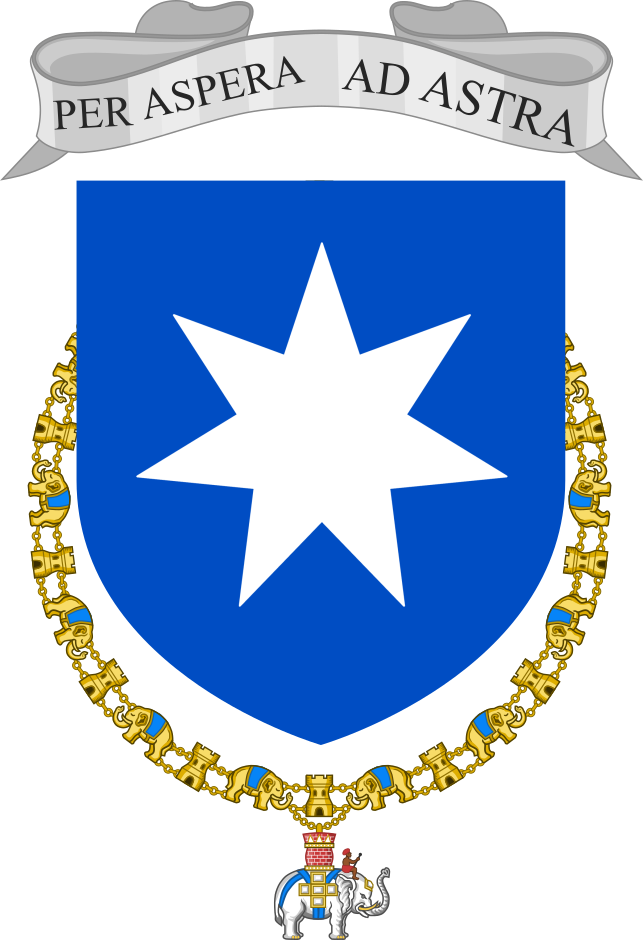
- Armiger: Arnold Mærsk Mc-Kinney Møller
- Adopted: 2000
- Motto: Per Aspera Ad Astra ("Through Hardships to the Stars")
- Order: Order of the Elephant
