= CSCL Arctic Ocean =

Container ship operated by China Shipping Container Lines

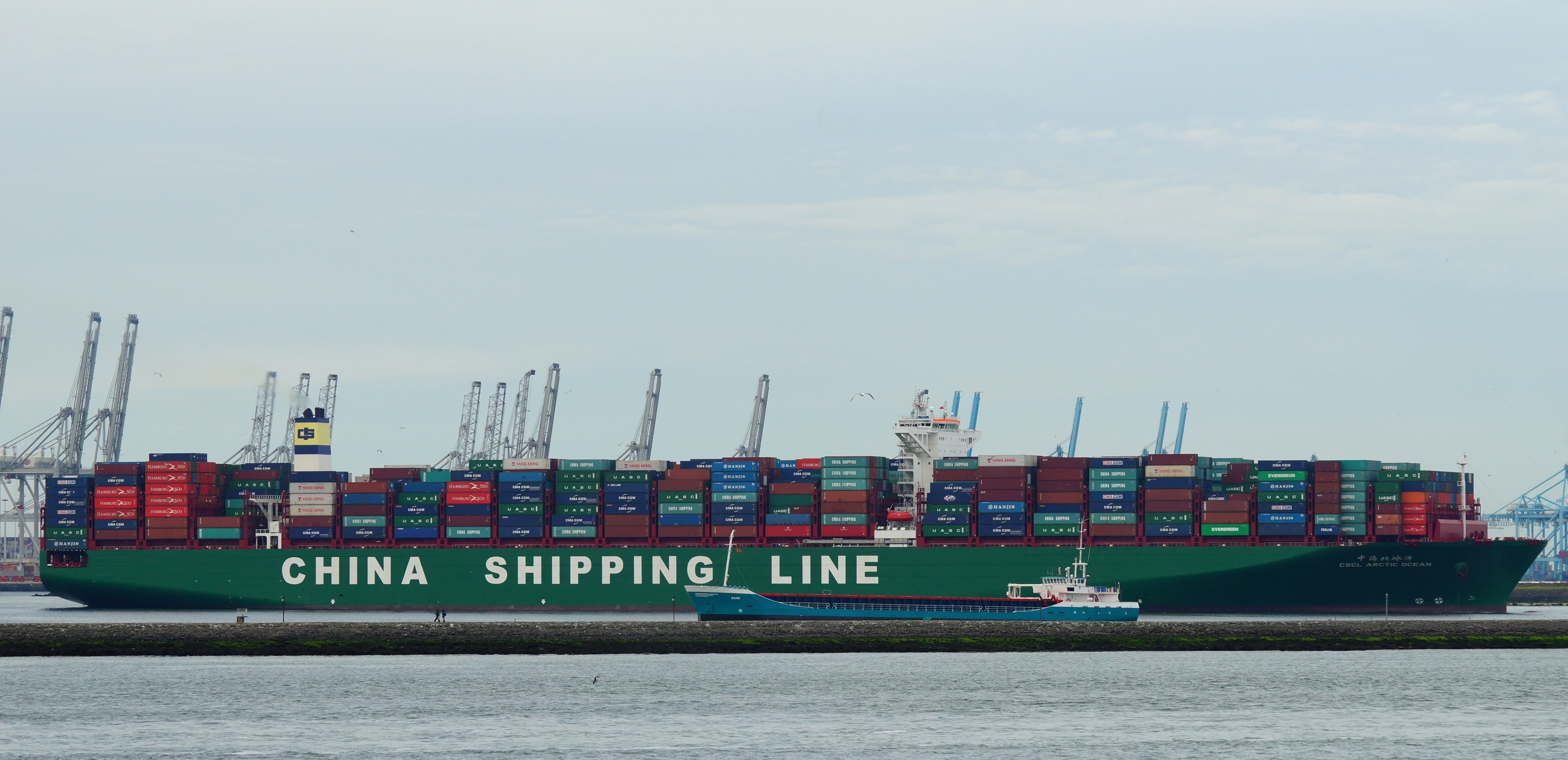
- CSCL Arctic Ocean dwarfs a smaller freighter, in Rotterdam.

History

Hong Kong
- Name: CSCL Arctic Ocean
- Operator: China Shipping Container Lines
- Port of registry: Hong Kong
- Identification: IMO number: 9695169
- Status: Operational

General characteristics
- Class & type: CSCL Globe-class container ship
- Tonnage: 187,541 GT; 184,605 DWT
- Length: 400 m (1,312 ft 4 in)
- Beam: 59 m (193 ft 7 in)
- Draft: 16 m (52 ft 6 in)
- Installed power: 69,720 kW at 84 rpm
- Propulsion: MAN B&W 12S90ME-C
- Speed: 22.0 knots (41 km/h) (maximum); 20.5 knots (38 km/h) (cruising)
- Capacity: 19,100 TEU
- Crew: 23

CSCL Arctic Ocean is a container ship, operated by China Shipping Container Lines.

At the time of her construction she and her four sister ships—Globe, Pacific Ocean, Atlantic Ocean and Indian Ocean—were the largest container ships afloat, each carrying 19,100 twenty-foot equivalent unit containers. Half a dozen slightly larger vessels have been built since then. Chinese officials have stated that the vessels cost $136 million each to build.

In May 2017 the vessel made a visit to the Baltic Sea. On May 19, 2017, the city of Gdańsk celebrated the arrival of the CSCL Arctic Ocean, as it marked the first time a container ship of its size had visited the port. On May 22, 2017, she moored at JadeWeserPort, the container port of Wilhelmshaven, Germany, on the River Weser.
