= CSCL Indian Ocean =

Container ship operated by China Shipping Container Lines

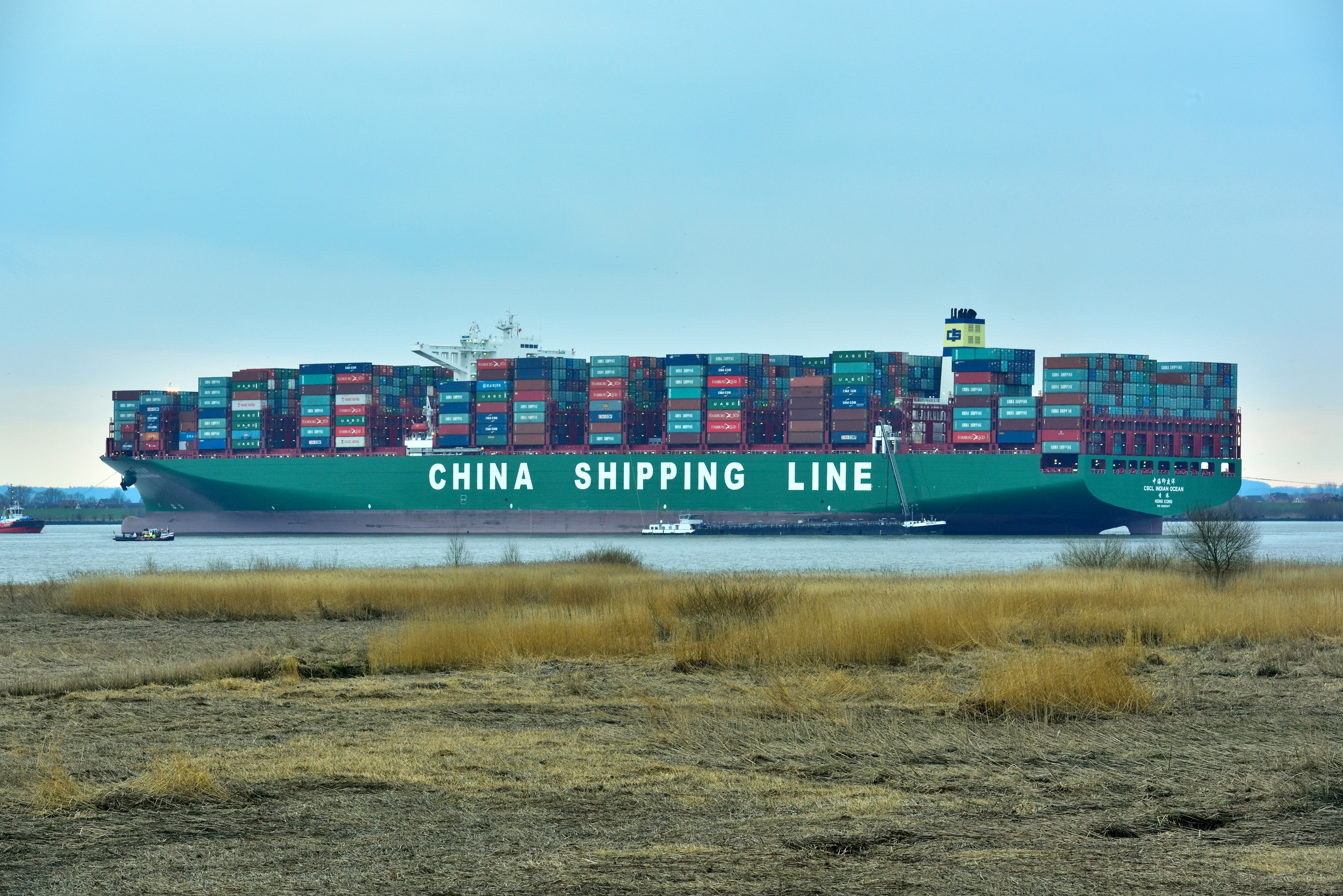
- CSCL Indian Ocean grounded in the Elbe River, while approaching Hamburg, on February 4, 2016.

History

Hong Kong
- Name: CSCL Indian Ocean
- Namesake: Indian Ocean
- Operator: China Shipping Container Lines
- Port of registry: Hong Kong
- Identification: IMO number: 9695157
- Status: Operational

General characteristics
- Class & type: Globe class container ship
- Tonnage: 187,541 GT; 184,605 DWT
- Length: 400 m (1,312 ft)
- Beam: 59 m (194 ft)
- Draft: 16.0 m (52.5 ft)
- Installed power: 69,720 kW at 84 rpm
- Propulsion: MAN B&W 12S90ME-C
- Speed: 22.0 knots (41 km/h) (maximum); 20.5 knots (38 km/h) (cruising)
- Capacity: 19,100 TEU
- Crew: 31

CSCL Indian Ocean is a container ship, operated by China Shipping Container Lines. She was built in Ulsan, Korea, by Hyundai Heavy Industries, and launched on November 15, 2014. At the time of her construction she, and her four sister ships, CSCL Globe, CSCL Pacific Ocean, CSCL Atlantic Ocean and CSCL Arctic Ocean, were the largest container ships afloat, each carrying 19,100 twenty-foot equivalent unit containers. Chinese officials said the vessels cost $136 million each to build.

On February 3, 2016 CSCL Indian Ocean grounded in the River Elbe, while approaching Hamburg, Germany. Her rudder controls were reported to have malfunctioned. It took almost a week to free her from the sandbank, because she grounded at high-tide. Her fuel was unloaded, and she was finally freed, February 9, six days later, during the next spring tide. Twelve tugboats were required to assist in freeing her. Two dredgers had helped cut away at the sandbank, near the grounding.

CSCL Indian Ocean's grounding triggered commentary over the wisdom of building such large vessels.
