= Madrid Maersk =

Container ship

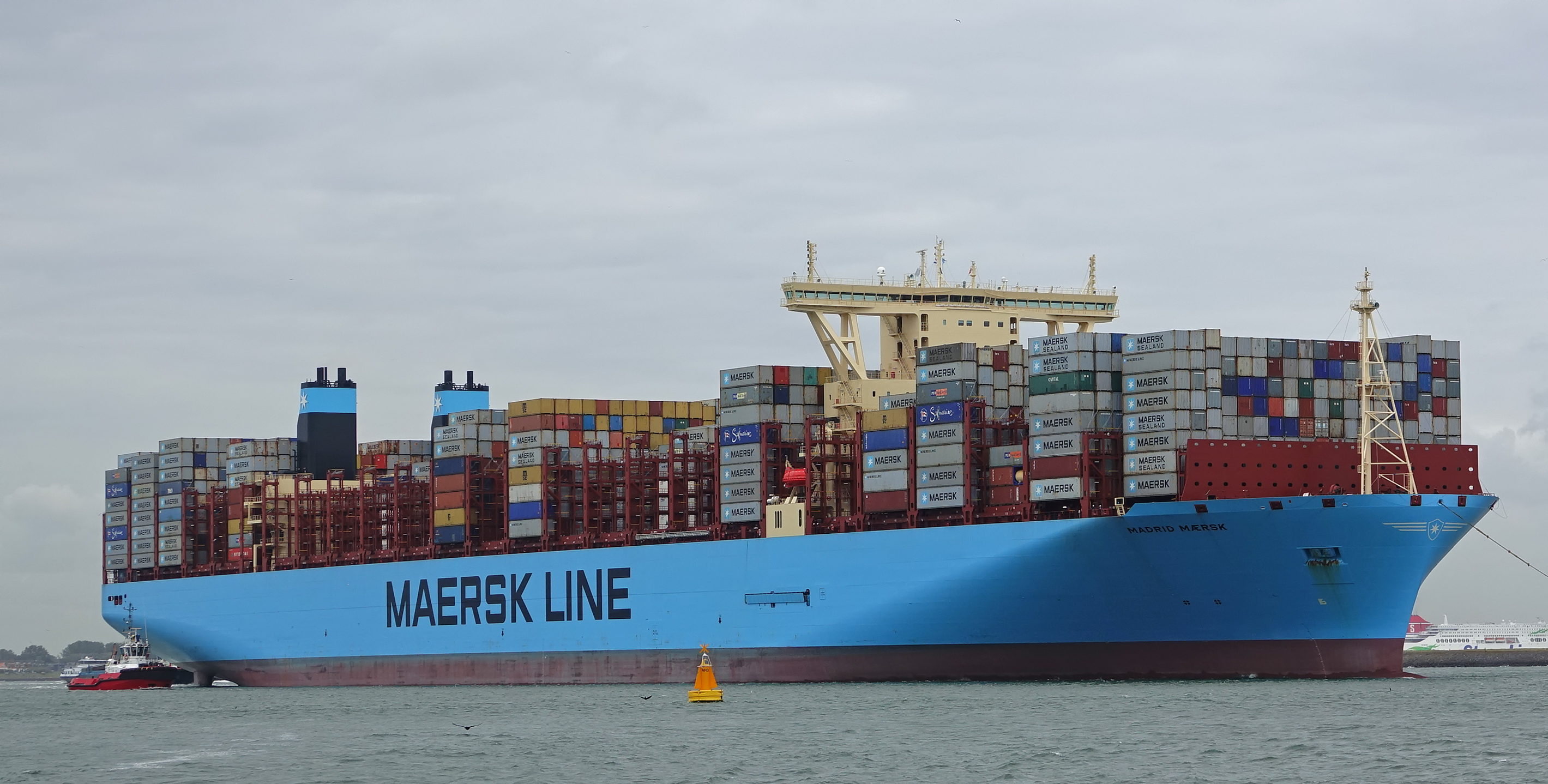
- Name: Madrid Maersk
- Owner: Maersk Line
- Operator: A.P. Moller–Maersk Group
- Port of registry: Copenhagen, Denmark
- Builder: Daewoo Shipbuilding & Marine Engineering
- Laid down: 2015
- Launched: 2017
- Acquired: April 2017
- Maiden voyage: 27 April 2017
- In service: April 2017
- Identification: Call sign: OWMD2; IMO number: 9778791; MMSI number: 219836000
- Status: In active service

General characteristics
- Class & type: 2nd-gen. Maersk Triple E-class container ship
- Tonnage: 214,286 GT; 206,000 DWT
- Length: 399 m (1,309 ft)
- Beam: 58.6 m (192 ft)
- Draught: 16.5 m (54 ft)
- Depth: 33.20 m (108.9 ft) (deck edge to keel)
- Installed power: 2 × MAN 7 cylinders (total 70,604 horsepower (52,649 kW))
- Propulsion: Two shafts, fixed pitch propellers
- Speed: 21 knots (39 km/h; 24 mph)
- Capacity: 20,568 TEU

Madrid Maersk was the largest container ship at the time of launch, but was surpassed shortly after the launch of OOCL Hong Kong, and she was the second container ship to surpass the 20,000-TEU threshold, after the MOL Triumph. She was built at the Daewoo Shipbuilding & Marine Engineering shipyard and was delivered in April 2017. Her first port on her maiden voyage was Port of Tianjin, China.

Madrid Maersk has a capacity of 20,568 TEUs and is the first of eleven second-generation Maersk Triple E-class container ships. Maersk Line, the company owner, is taking delivery of the remaining ten plus 17 additional smaller vessels to replace older ships through the end of 2018.

== See also ==
- Mærsk E-class container ship
- Maersk Triple E-class container ship
