= Ane Mærsk Mc-Kinney Uggla =

Danish-Swedish business executive

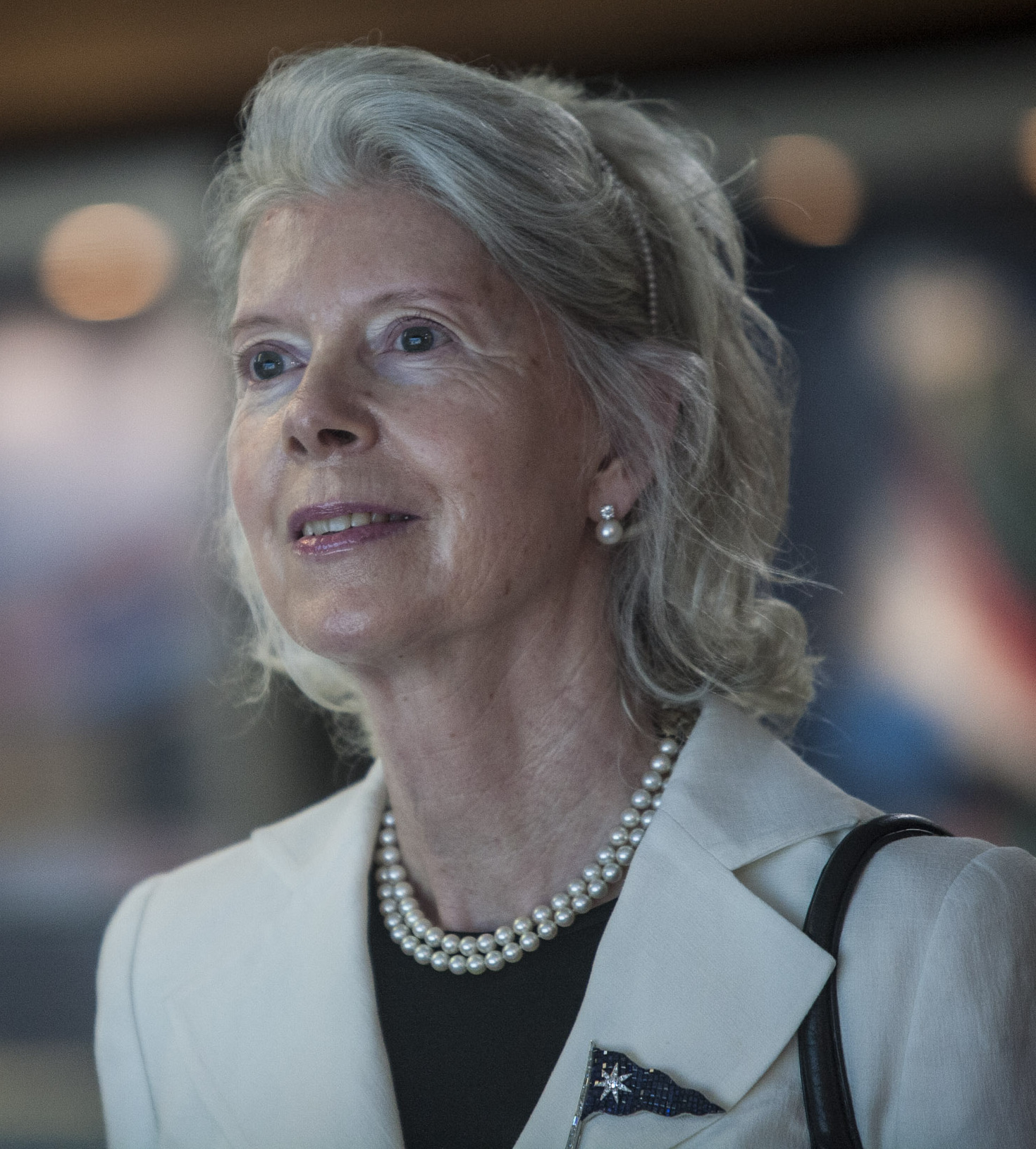
Ane Mærsk Mc-Kinney Uggla

Ane Mærsk Mc-Kinney Uggla (born 3 July 1948), often referred to as Ane Uggla, is a Danish-Swedish business executive and the youngest daughter of Mærsk Mc-Kinney Møller. Since 2012 she has chaired the A.P. Møller Foundation which owns the controlling stake in the Maersk Group, the world's largest container-ship and supply-vessel operator. She is considered to be one of the most powerful women in Denmark.

== Biography ==
Born on 3 July 1948 in Stockholm, Sweden, Uggla attended N. Zahle's School in Copenhagen, Denmark. She went on to study modern languages at the Copenhagen Business School (1966–69). She completed her education in 1977 with a B.A. from Stockholm University. From 1986 to 1997, she worked for the Swedish Red Cross.

Uggla lives in Stockholm but spends a few days a week in Copenhagen in her role as vice-chairman of A.P. Moller–Maersk, a position she has held since February 2010.

Speaking in 2013 about her involvement the A.P. Møller-Mærsk conglomerate, Uggla commented: "We have a fantastic company with a special character of its own. That needs to be preserved and I am happy to be an important part of it ... When I became chair [in 2012] after my father's death, I felt well prepared for the assignment. An assignment I have taken on gladly, not just as a duty."

Ane Uggla was married to Swedish naval officer Peter Uggla from Stockholm, who died in April 2020. She has two sons: Johan and Robert, both of whom are developing their careers at A.P. Møller-Mærsk.

== Awards ==
In 2005, Ane Uggla was decorated with the Order of the Dannebrog.
