= Maersk Mc-Kinney Moller (ship) =

Triple E-class container ship

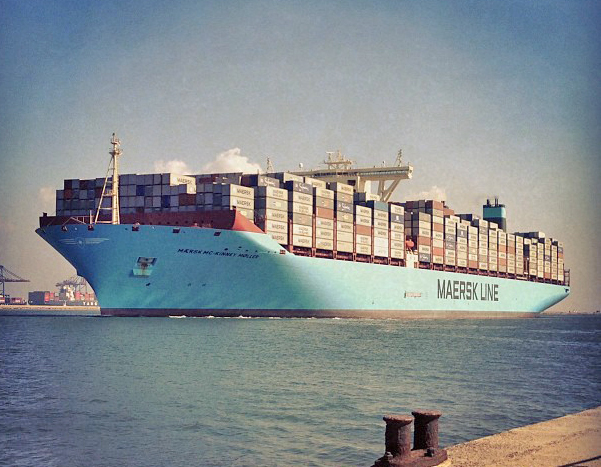
- Maersk Mc-Kinney Moller is passing Port Said, Egypt on its maiden voyage through the Suez Canal in 2013.

History
- Name: Maersk Mc-Kinney Moller
- Owner: A.P. Moller – Maersk Group
- Operator: Maersk Line
- Port of registry: Hellerup, Denmark
- Builder: Daewoo Shipbuilding & Marine Engineering (DSME), South Korea
- Cost: $190 million
- Laid down: 27 November 2012
- Launched: 24 February 2013
- In service: 2 July 2013
- Identification: IMO number: 9619907; Call sign: OWIZ2; MMSI number: 219018271
- Status: In active service

General characteristics
- Class & type: Triple E-class container ship
- Tonnage: 194,849 GT; 79,120 NT; 165,000 DWT
- Length: 399 m (1,309 ft 1 in)
- Beam: 59 m (193 ft 7 in)
- Depth: 14.5 m (47 ft 7 in)
- Installed power: 2 × MAN-B&W 8S80ME-C 9.2 (2 × 29,680 kW (39,800 hp))
- Propulsion: Two shafts; fixed-pitch propellers
- Speed: 23 knots (43 km/h; 26 mph)
- Capacity: 18,270 TEU
- Crew: 19 (standard)
- Notes: Suezmax

Maersk Mc-Kinney Moller (Danish: [ˈmɛɐ̯sk məˈkʰini ˈmølˀɐ]) is the first ship of Maersk Line's Triple E class of container vessels. At the time of its entry into service in 2013, it had the largest cargo capacity in twenty-foot equivalent unit (TEU) of any vessel, and was the longest container ship in service worldwide. Constructed for Maersk by Daewoo Shipbuilding & Marine Engineering (DSME) of South Korea, it was launched in February 2013 and began operational service during July 2013. It was named for Arnold Mærsk Mc-Kinney Møller, the CEO of Maersk from 1965 to 1993. The ship is the first of a class of 20 identical vessels.

== Design overview ==
Maersk Mc-Kinney Moller was the world's largest and most efficient operational container ship at the time of its completion, totalling 399 metres (1,309 ft 1 in) in length and with a cargo capacity of 18,270 TEU containers. Its efficiency is maximized by fuel-efficient engines and a maximum speed of 23 knots (43 km/h; 26 mph), reducing its fuel consumption and carbon dioxide emissions by 20 percent compared to the previous most efficient cargo vessel. However, due to its size, cost, and use of twin engines, its efficiency is reduced severely if it is not fully loaded; the shipping analyst Richard Meade asserts that it is "probably the most inefficient ship ever built" when loaded to less than 50%. During normal operations, Maersk Mc-Kinney Moller is crewed by a complement of 19, although it has sufficient accommodation for 34 crew members.

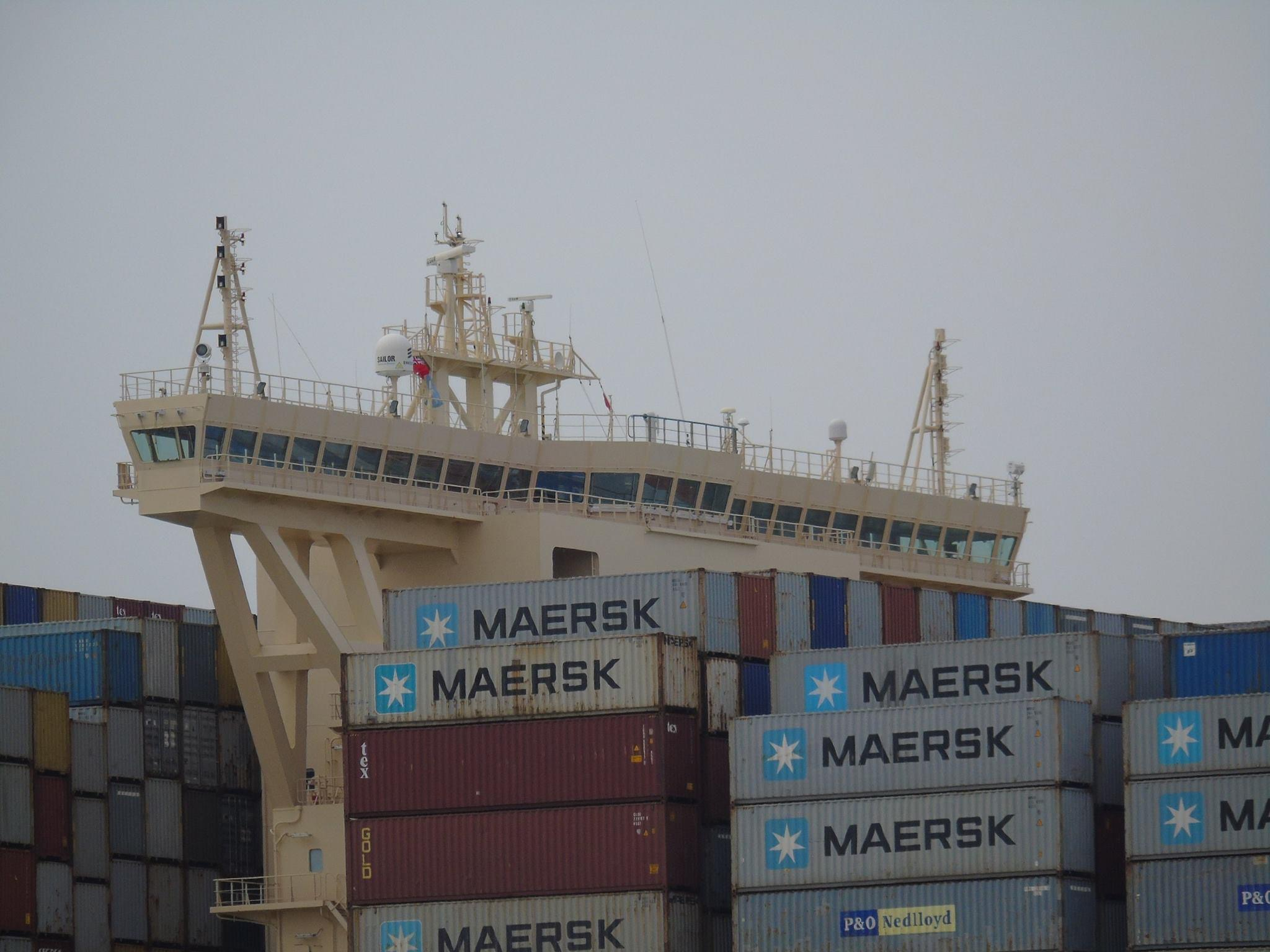
The ship's bridge.

== Career ==
Size comparison of some of the longest ships ever constructed. From top to bottom: Knock Nevis (ex-Seawise Giant), Maersk Mc-Kinney Moller, Vale Brasil, Allure of the Seas, and USS Enterprise (CVN-65).

The contract for the construction of Maersk Mc-Kinney Moller was signed on 21 February 2011. Work began with a steel cutting ceremony at the DSME shipyard at Okpo, Geoje, South Korea, on 18 June 2012. The hull was laid on 27 November 2012 and the boat was officially launched on 24 February 2013.

The Maersk Mc-Kinney Moller left the Daewoo shipyards in an operational capacity in July 2013, whereupon it began sea trials. Initially, it was forced to operate at much less than its maximum cargo capacity, as most ports certified to handle Triple E-class vessels at that time lacked gantry cranes tall enough to load the ship completely. In August 2013, it made its first transit of the Suez Canal. In January 2014, the Maersk Mc-Kinney Moller arrived at its first operational port of call, Singapore. In November 2014, the Maersk Mc-Kinney Moller was superseded as the world's largest container ship by China Shipping Container Lines' CSCL Globe.

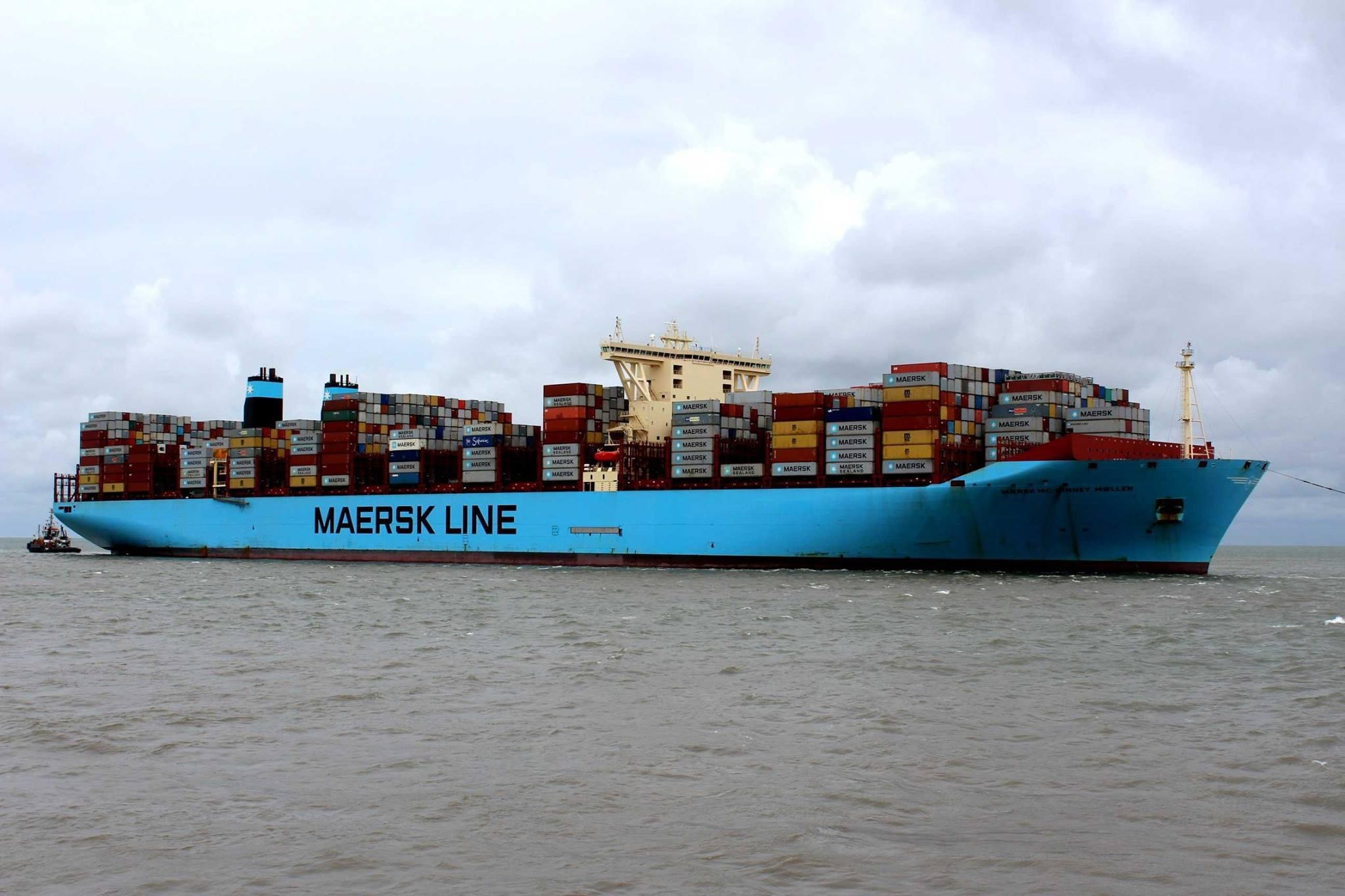
Maersk Mc-Kinney Moller inbound Wilhelmshaven, Germany in September 2015.

== See also ==
- E-class container ship, the class preceding the Triple E

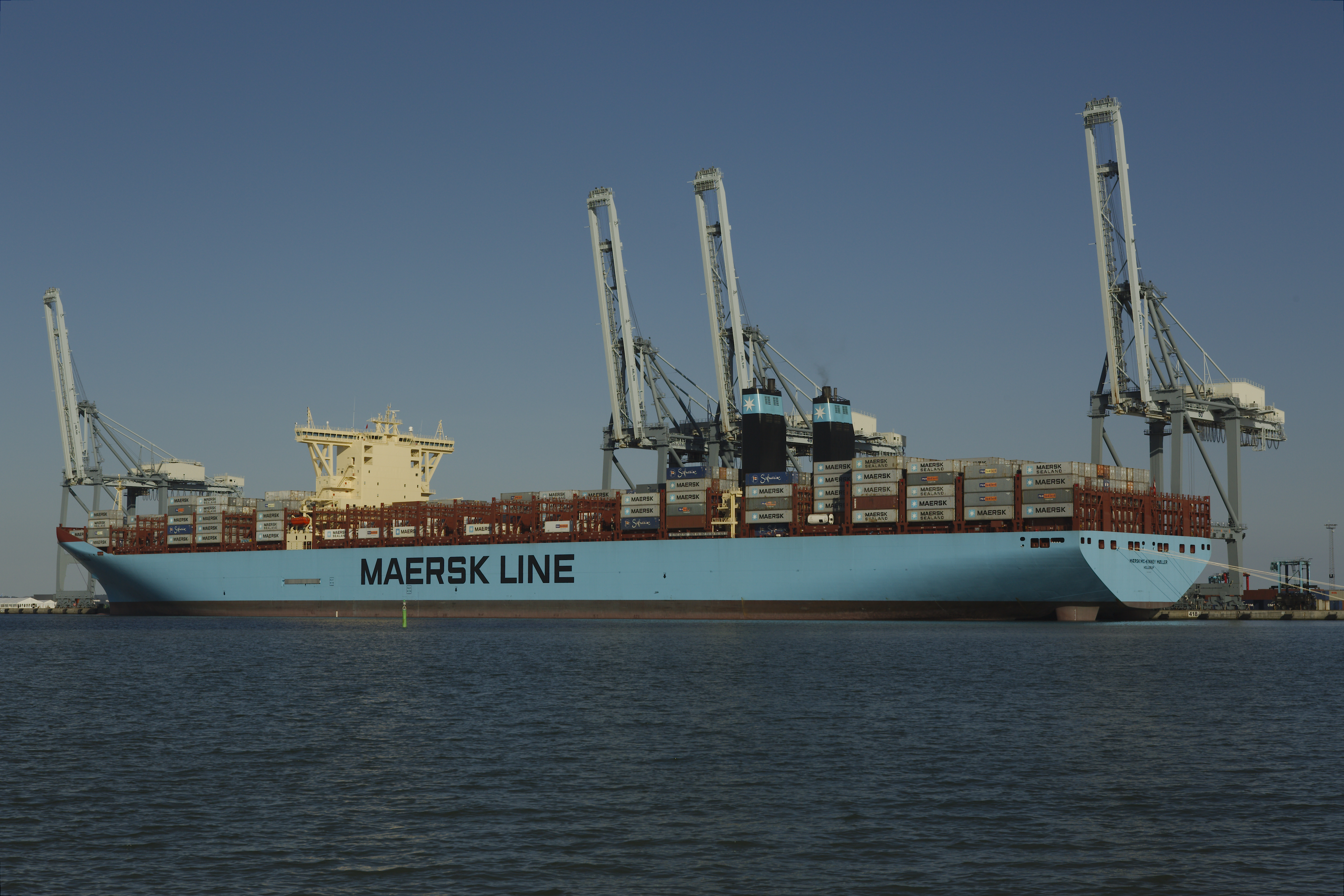
Maersk Mc-Kinney Moller in Aarhus
