= Globe-class container ship =

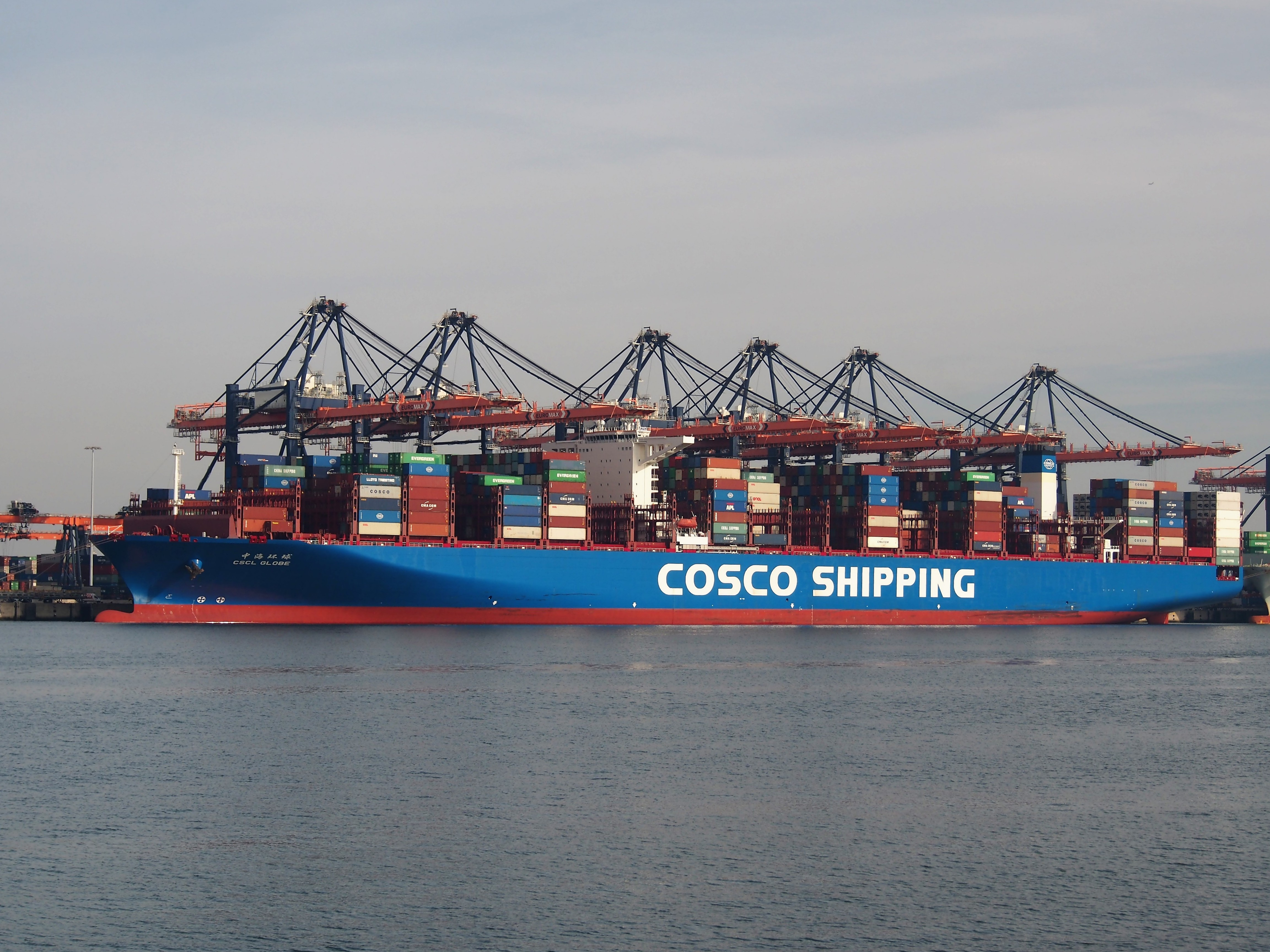
- CSCL Globe in the port of Rotterdam

Class overview
- Builders: Hyundai Heavy Industries
- Operators: COSCO SHIPPING Lines
- In service: 2014-present
- Planned: 5
- Building: 0
- Completed: 5
- Active: 5

General characteristics
- Type: Container ship
- Tonnage: 188,638 GT
- Length: 399.6 m (1,311 ft)
- Beam: 58.7 m (193 ft)
- Draught: 16 m (52 ft)
- Propulsion: MAN B&W 12S90ME-C9.2
- Capacity: 18,982 TEU

The Globe class is a series of 5 container ships built for China Shipping Container Lines and later operated by COSCO SHIPPING Lines. The ships have a maximum theoretical capacity of 18,982 TEU. The ships were built by Hyundai Heavy Industries at their shipyard in Ulsan, South Korea. The first ship, the CSCL Globe, was delivered on 18 November 2014. At the time she was the largest container ship in the world.

== List of ships ==
Ship	Yard number	IMO number	Delivery	Status	ref
CSCL Globe	2696	9695121	18 Nov 2014	In service	
CSCL Pacific Ocean	2697	9695133	19 Dec 2014	In service	
CSCL Indian Ocean	2699	9695157	23 Jan 2015	In service	
CSCL Arctic Ocean	2700	9695169	20 Mar 2015	In service	
CSCL Atlantic Ocean	2698	9695145	29 Apr 2015	In service	

== See also ==
- Star-class container ship
