= Triple E-class container ship =

Class of large container ships

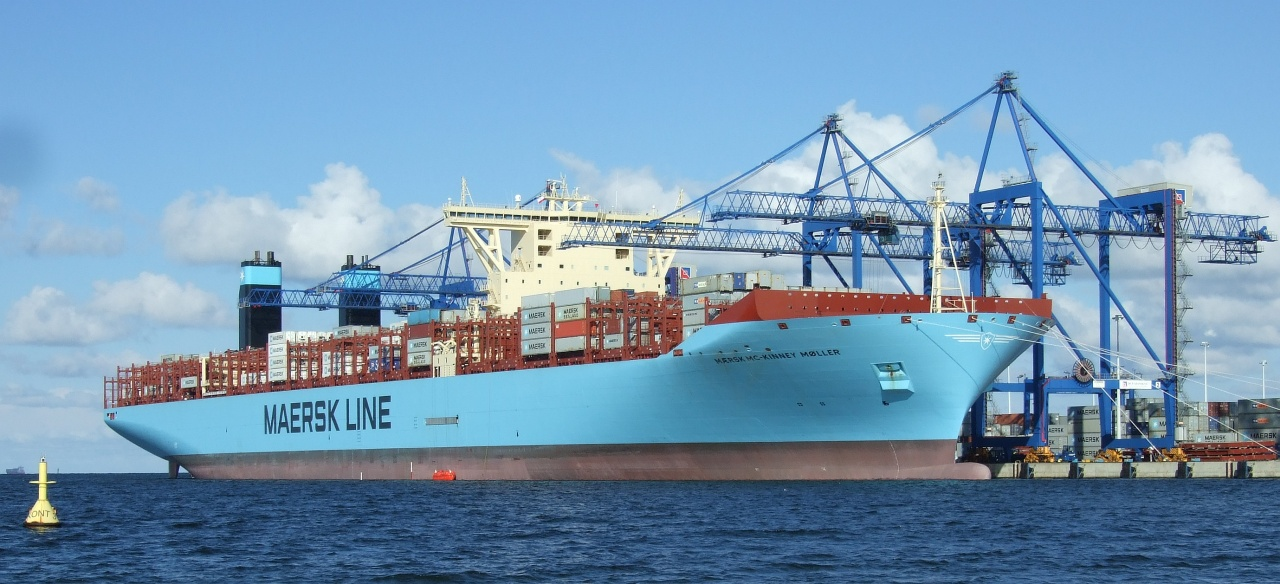
- Triple E-class container ship Mærsk Mc-Kinney Møller

Class overview
- Builders: Daewoo Shipbuilding
- Operators: Maersk
- Preceded by: E class
- Succeeded by: H-class container ship
- Planned: 31
- Building: 0
- Completed: 31
- Active: 31

General characteristics
- Type: Container ship
- Tonnage: 196,000 DWT
- Displacement: 55,000 tonnes (empty)
- Length: 399.2 m (1,309 ft 9 in)
- Beam: 58.6 m (192 ft 3 in)
- Draft: 16 m (52 ft 6 in)
- Decks: 4
- Installed power: 2×29,680 kilowatts (39,800 hp)
- Propulsion: Twin MAN 8S80ME-C9 engines
- Speed: Design cruise: 16 knots (30 km/h; 18 mph) Max: 23 knots (43 km/h; 26 mph)
- Capacity: 18,270 TEU
- Notes: Cost $185 million

General characteristics (2nd generation)
- Type: Container ship
- Tonnage: 210,019 DWT
- Length: 399.2 m (1,309 ft 9 in)
- Beam: 58.6 m (192 ft 3 in)
- Draft: 17 m (55 ft 9 in)
- Installed power: 2×31,000 kilowatts (42,000 hp)
- Propulsion: Twin MAN engines
- Capacity: 20,568 TEU

The Triple E class is a family of very large container ships with a capacity of more than 18,000 TEUs, which are owned and operated by Maersk Line.

With a length of 399.2 m (1,309 ft 9 in), when they were built they were the largest container ships in the world, but were subsequently surpassed by larger ones such as CSCL Globe.

In February and June 2011, Maersk Line awarded Daewoo Shipbuilding & Marine Engineering two US$1.9 billion contracts ($3.8bn total) to build twenty ships of this class.

The name "Triple E" is derived from the class's three design principles: "Economy of scale, Energy efficiency, and Environmental impact improvement".

The ships are 399.2 metres (1,309 ft 9 in) long and 59 metres (193 ft 7 in) wide. While only 3 metres (9 ft 10 in) longer and 4 metres (13 ft 1 in) wider than the Mærsk E class, the Triple E ships are able to carry 2,500 more containers. With a beam of 59 metres, they are too wide to traverse the Panama Canal, but can easily transit the Suez Canal.

One of the class's main design features is its dual 29.68-megawatt (39,800 hp), eight-cylinder, ultra-long stroke two-stroke diesel engines, driving two propellers at a design speed of 19 knots (35 km/h; 22 mph). This class is by design slower than its predecessors, using a strategy known as slow steaming expected to lower fuel consumption by 37% and carbon dioxide emissions per container by 50%. The Triple E design helped Maersk win a "Most Sustainable Ship Operator of the Year" award in July 2011.

Maersk uses these ships to service routes between Europe and Asia, projecting that Chinese exports will continue to grow. European-Asian trade represents the company's largest market; thus it already has 100 ships serving the route.

== Orders and history ==
In February 2011 Maersk announced orders for a new "Triple E" family of container ships with a capacity of 18,000 TEU, with an emphasis on lower fuel consumption. They were built by Daewoo Shipbuilding & Marine Engineering (DSME) in South Korea; the initial order, for ten ships, was valued at US$1.9 billion (2 trillion Korean Won); Maersk had options to buy a further twenty ships. In June 2011 Maersk announced that 10 more ships had been ordered for $1.9bn, but an option for a third group of ten ships would not be exercised. Payment of the ship is "tail-heavy": 40% while the ship is being built, and the remaining 60% paid on delivery. Deliveries were scheduled to begin in 2013. Maersk negotiated a two-year warranty, whereas the standard is one year.

Prior to 2010, many Maersk container ships were built at Maersk's Odense Steel Shipyard in Denmark, but Asian builders had become more competitively priced. Maersk had approached several different builders in Asia, having ruled out European shipbuilders on grounds of cost, and Chinese on technological grounds. DSME builds three Triple-Es at a time, and it takes little more than a year to produce a ship.

Investment in more efficient ships helped Maersk win the "Sustainable Ship Operator of the Year" award from Petromedia Group's on-line publication sustainableshipping.com in July 2011.

In 2015, Maersk ordered an additional series of eleven 20,568 TEU second-generation Triple E-class ships, due to be delivered from 2017 onwards. The first ship is the Madrid Maersk. She went on her maiden voyage to Antwerp.

=== Ships ===
Maersk Triple E class
No.	Ship name	Yard number	IMO number	Delivered	Status	Ref.
1	Mærsk Mc-Kinney Møller	4250	9619907	2 July 2013	In service	
2	Majestic Mærsk	4251	9619919	2 August 2013	In service	
3	Mary Mærsk	4252	9619921	30 August 2013	In service	
4	Marie Mærsk	4253	9619933	18 October 2013	In service	
5	Madison Mærsk	4254	9619945	6 January 2014	In service	
6	Magleby Mærsk	4255	9619957	10 February 2014	In service	
7	Maribo Mærsk	4256	9619969	7 April 2014	In service	
8	Marstal Mærsk	4257	9619971	20 May 2014	In service	
9	Matz Mærsk	4258	9619983	10 June 2014	In service	
10	Mayview Mærsk	4259	9619995	25 July 2014	In service	
11	Merete Mærsk	4262	9632064	22 August 2014	In service	
12	Mogens Mærsk	4263	9632090	17 September 2014	In service	
13	Morten Mærsk	4264	9632105	10 November 2014	In service	
14	Munkebo Mærsk	4265	9632117	18 December 2014	In service	
15	Maren Mærsk	4266	9632129	29 December 2014	In service	
16	Margrethe Mærsk	4267	9632131	13 April 2015	In service	
17	Marchen Mærsk	4268	9632143	27 May 2015	In service	
18	Mette Mærsk	4269	9632155	6 May 2015	In service	
19	Marit Mærsk	4270	9632167	5 June 2015	In service	
20	Mathilde Mærsk	4271	9632179	30 June 2015	In service	
Maersk Triple E class (2nd Generation)
21	Madrid Mærsk	4302	9778791	7 April 2017	In service	
22	Munich Mærsk	4303	9778806	15 June 2017	In service	
23	Moscow Mærsk	4304	9778818	14 July 2017	In service	
24	Milan Mærsk	4305	9778820	13 September 2017	In service	
25	Monaco Mærsk	4306	9778832	30 October 2017	In service	
26	Marseille Mærsk	4307	9778844	4 January 2018	In service	
27	Manchester Mærsk	4308	9780445	8 January 2018	In service	
28	Murcia Mærsk	4309	9780457	28 February 2018	In service	
29	Manila Mærsk	4310	9780469	29 March 2018	In service	
30	Mumbai Mærsk	4311	9780471	3 May 2018	In service	
31	Maastricht Mærsk	4312	9780483	10 January 2019	In service	
Source: Equasis, grosstonnage

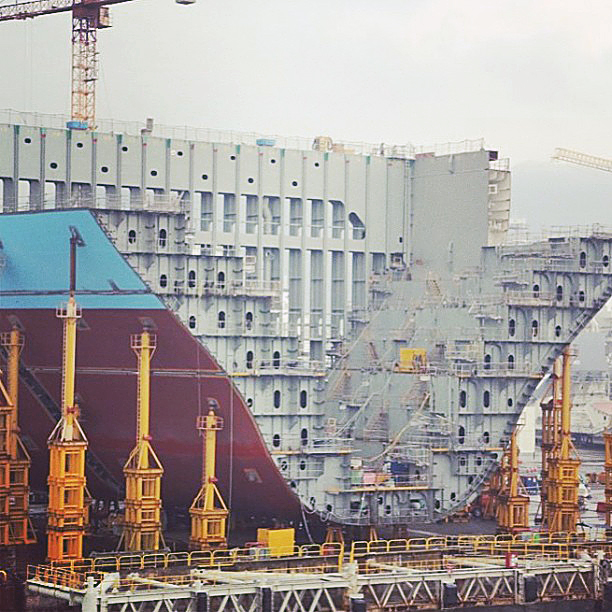
Section of a Triple E-class ship, under construction

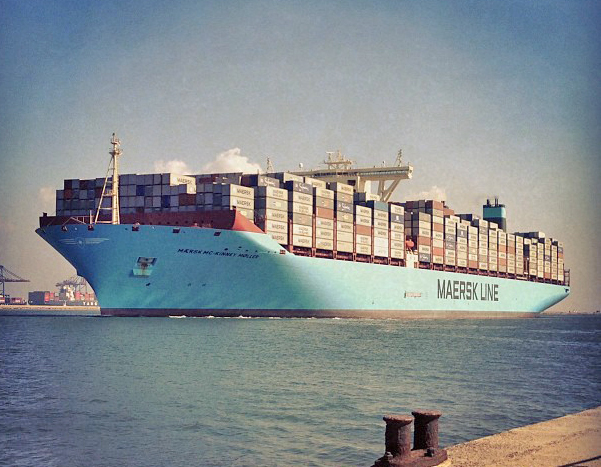
Mærsk Mc-Kinney Møller, passing through the Suez Canal

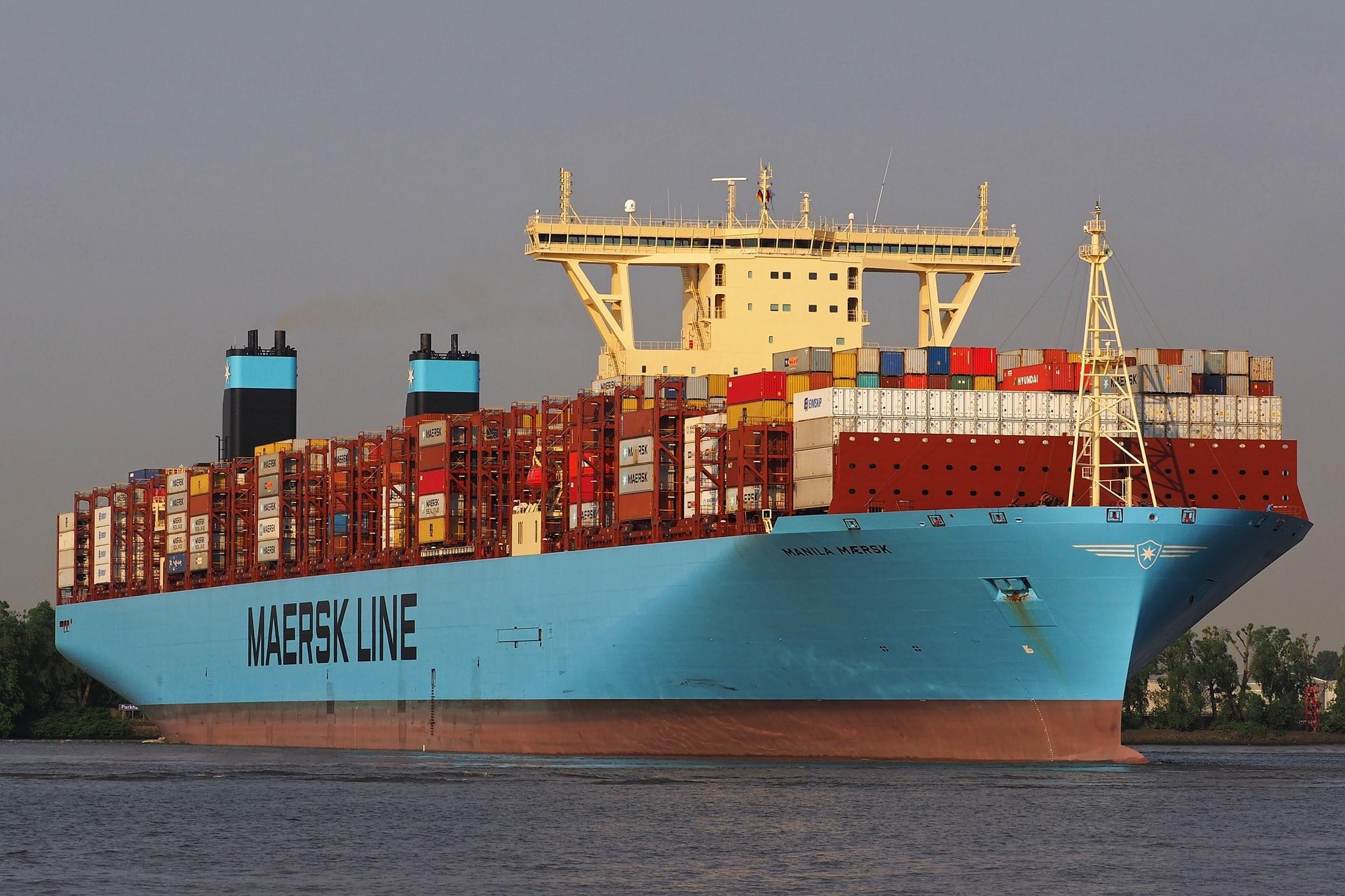
Manila Maersk inbound Hamburg, Germany, in June 2018

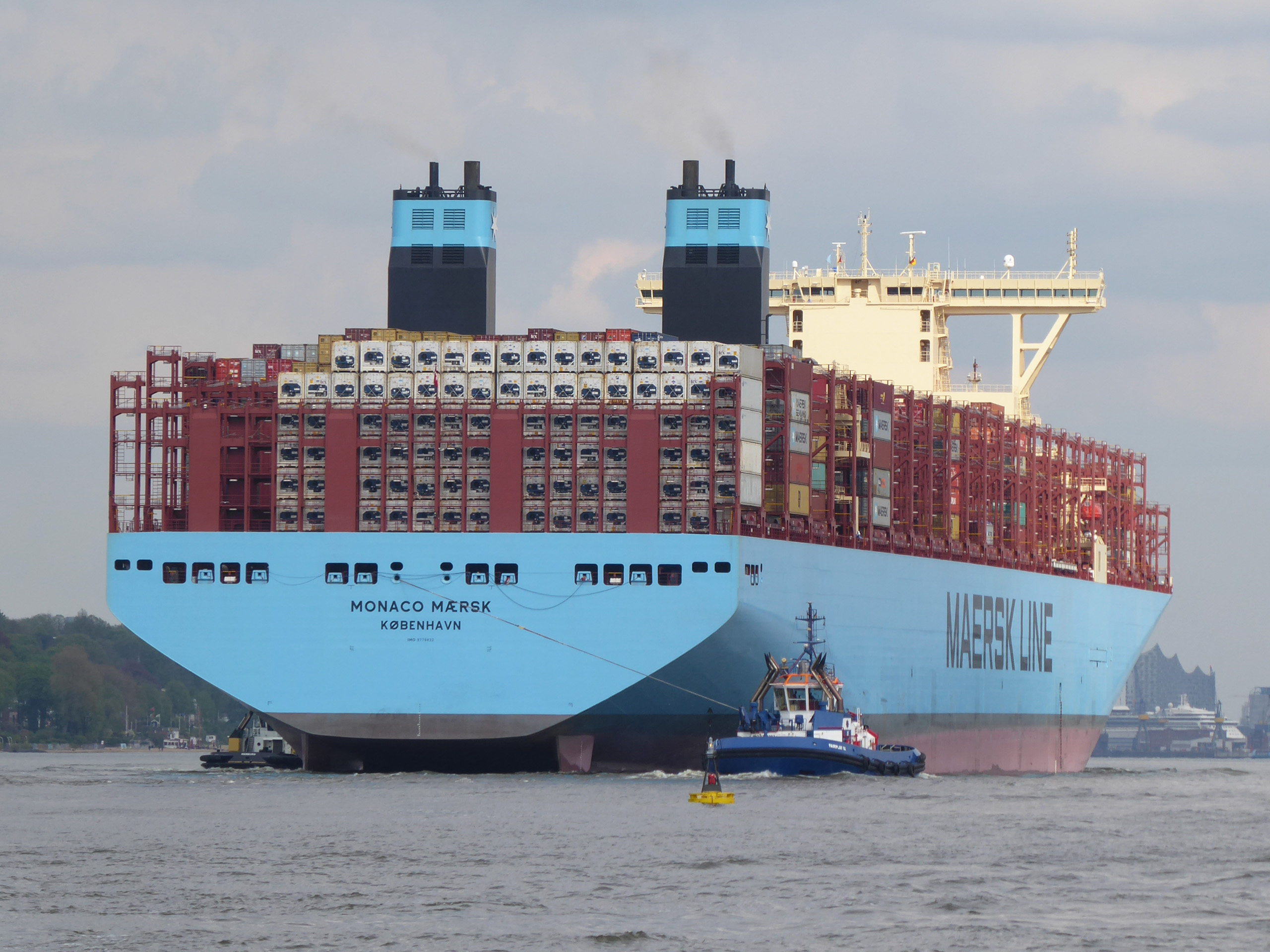
Monaco Maersk of the 2nd generation (2018 in Hamburg)

== Design ==
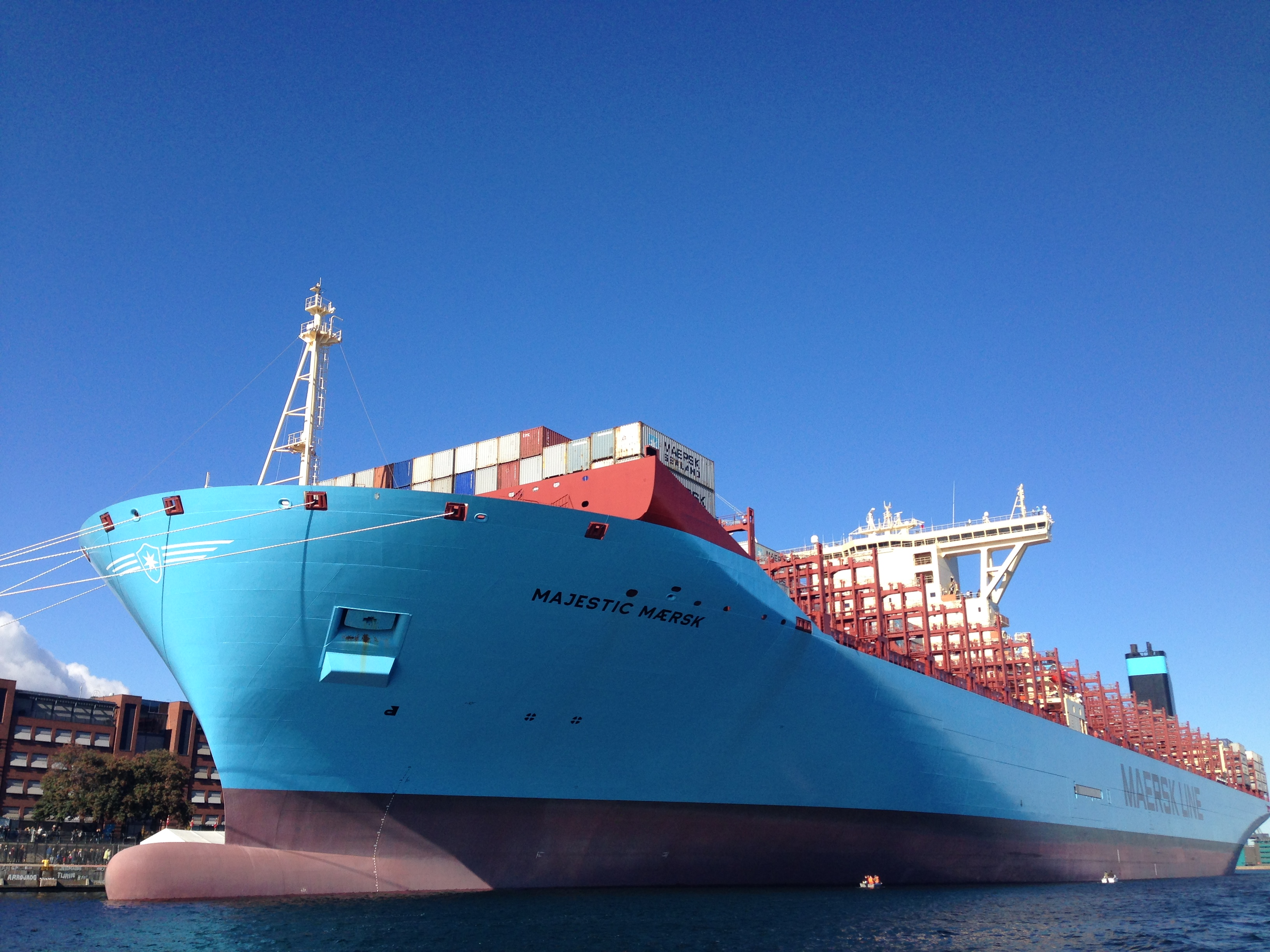
The Majestic Maersk is in Copenhagen in September 2013, shortly after entering service. Maersk Line opened the ship up for public tours for four days. At the time, this was the longest and largest ship in service of any type.

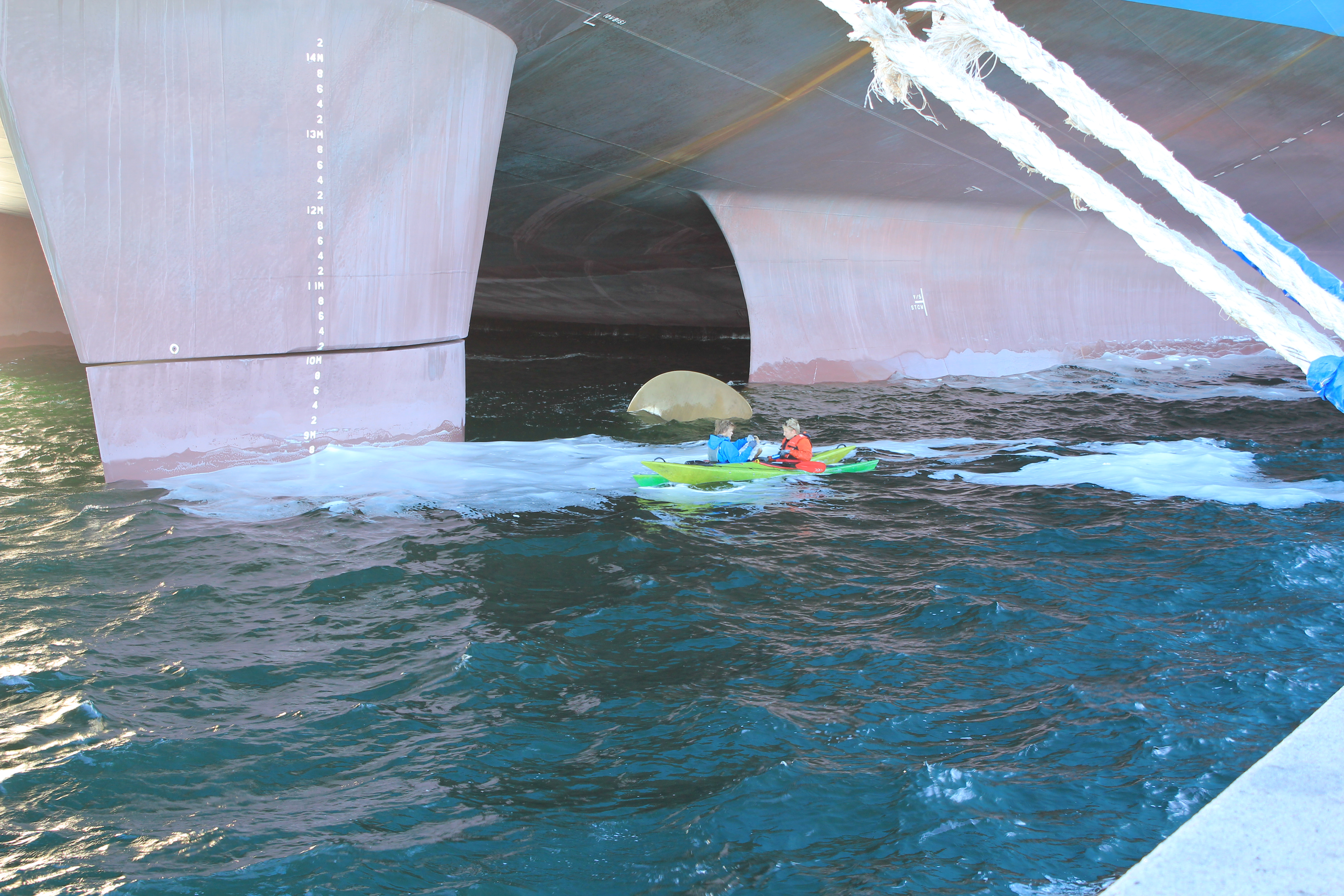
Kayakers are seen paddling under Majestic Maersk's twin-skeg stern.

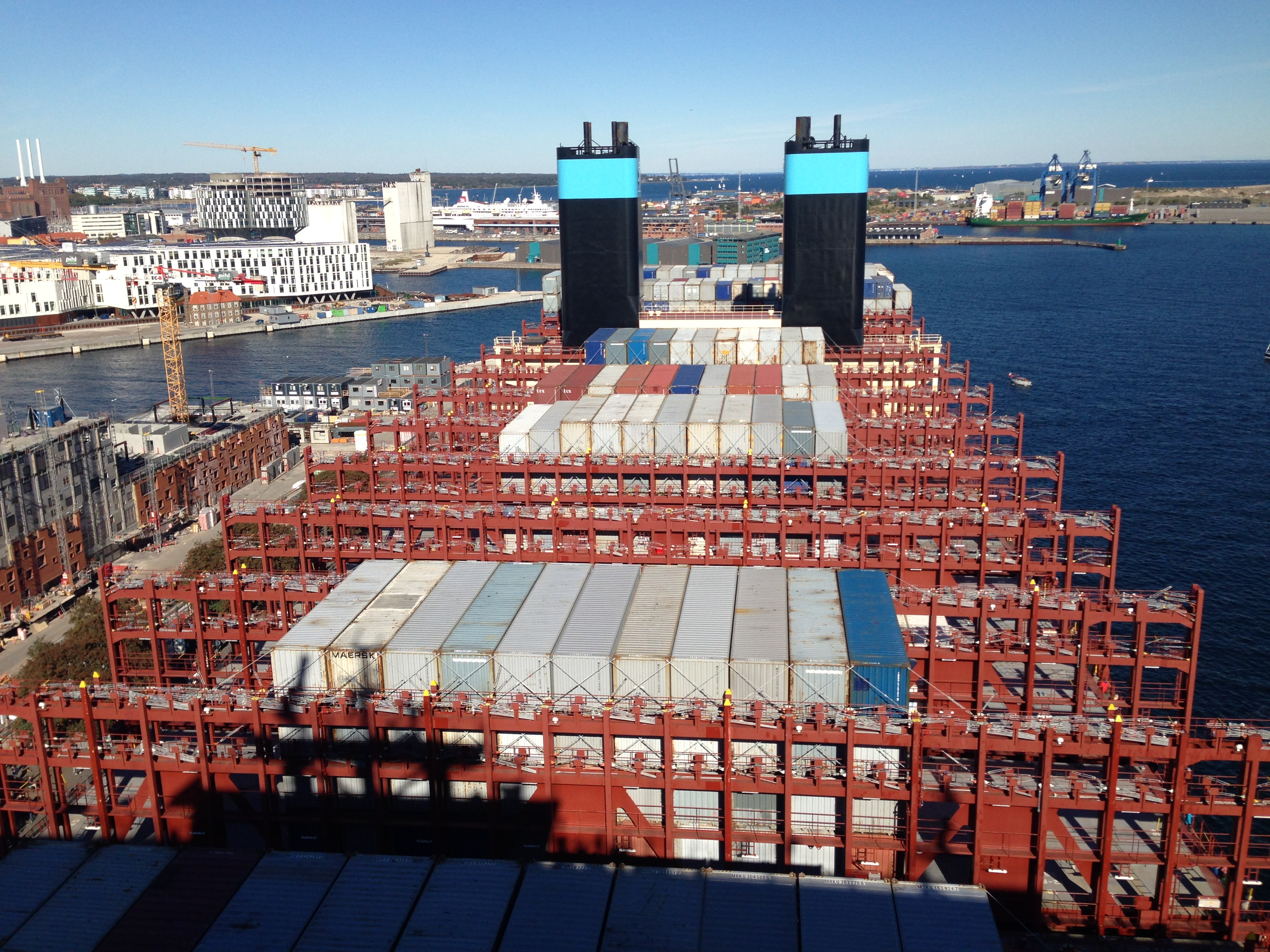
Photo of Majestic Maersk showing its rear decks partially filled with containers

=== Specifications ===
- Capacity: 18,270 TEU
- Length: 399.2 metres
- Draft: 14.5 metres
- Beam: 59 metres
- Height: 73 metres
- Optimum speed: 19 knots (35 km/h)
- Top speed: 25 knots (46 km/h)
- Deadweight: 165,000 tonnes
- In the first 10 vessels engines are twin MAN 8S80ME-C9.2 engines, 8-cylinders, 800 mm bore, 3450 mm stroke, rated at 29.7 MW @ 73 rpm each, with fuel consumption of 168 g/kWh (80 m^{3} (21,200 US gal) per day)
- Propellers: Twin propellers, with 4 blades, 9.8 m in diameter

=== Propulsion ===
Unlike conventional single-engined container ships, the new class of ships has a twin-skeg design: it has twin diesel engines, each driving a separate propeller. Usually, a single engine is more efficient, but using two propellers allows a better distribution of pressure, which increases the propeller efficiency more than the disadvantage of using two engines.

The engines have waste heat recovery (WHR) systems; these are also used in 20 other Mærsk vessels including the eight E-class ships. The name "Triple E class" refers to three design principles: "Economies of scale, energy efficiency, and environmental impact improvement".

The twin-skeg principle also means that the engines can be lower and further back, allowing more room for cargo. Maersk requires ultra-long stroke two-stroke engines running at 80 rpm (versus 90 rpm in the E class); but this requires more propeller area for the same effect, and such a combination is only possible with two propellers due to the shallow water depth of the desired route.

A slower speed of 19 knots is designed, compared to the 23–26 knots of similar ships. The top speed would be 25 knots, but steaming at 20 knots would reduce fuel consumption by 37%, and at 17.5 knots fuel consumption would be halved. These slower speeds would add 2–6 days to journey times.

The various environmental features are expected to cost $30 million per ship, of which the WHR is to cost $10 million. Carbon dioxide emissions, per container, are expected to be 50% lower than emissions by typical ships on the Asia-Europe route and 20% lower than Emma Maersk. These are the most efficient container ships per TEU in the world. A cradle-to-cradle design principle was used to improve scrapping when the ships end their life.

The Madrid Maersk and subsequent ships in the series use electric motor-generator sets to improve operation.

=== Dimensions and layout ===
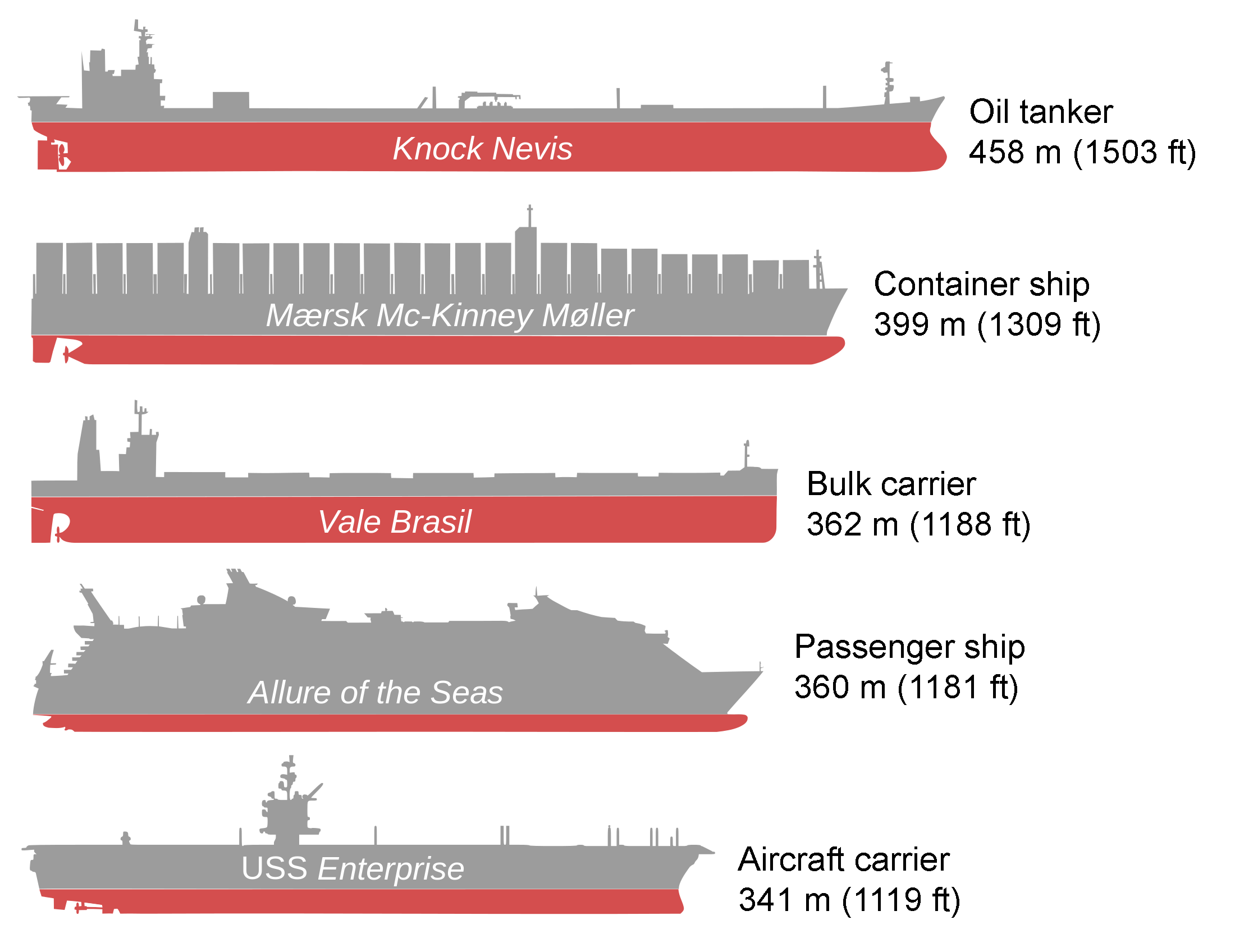
2013 comparison between the longest ships for different types of vessels, Mærsk Mc-Kinney Møller being the longest container ship at that time

The ships were the longest in the world. They have since been surpassed by other container ships, like the MV Barzan, exactly 400 m (1,312 ft) long. The Triple E series and its competitors often leapfrog each other for capacity as the types are updated with new ships larger than their sisters. For a while, Madrid Maersk with 20,568 TEU had the world's largest capacity until superseded by the 21,413 TEU OOCL Hong Kong.

The hull is more 'boxy' with a U cross-section compared to the V-shape of Maersk's E class; this allows more containers to be stored at lower levels so, while the Triple E class is only 3 m (9.8 ft) wider and 4 m (13 ft) longer, it can carry 2,500 (16%) more containers. The Triple E class can carry 23 rows of containers compared to 22 of the E class, which makes better use of the reach of current terminal cranes.

The deckhouse is relatively further forward, whilst the engines are to the rear; similar to CMA CGM's Explorer class of containerships, also built by Daewoo. The forward deckhouse allows containers to be stacked higher in front of the bridge, further increasing capacity while maintaining forward visibility sufficient to comply with SOLAS regulation V/22.

The Triple E-class vessels are operated by a crew of 13, while the even larger Globe class requires 31 on board.

When the class was ordered, no port in the Americas could handle ships of their size. However, the following suitable ports include Shanghai, Ningbo, Xiamen, Qingdao, Yantian, Hong Kong, Tanjung Pelepas, Singapore, and Colombo in Asia, and Rotterdam, Gothenburg, Wilhelmshaven, Bremerhaven, Southampton, London Gateway, Le Havre, Felixstowe, Gdańsk, Antwerp, and Algeciras in Europe. The ships will be too large for the New Panamax-sized locks on the Panama Canal, and their main route is expected to be Asia-Europe (through the Suez Canal). The draft of the Triple E class is 14.5 metres (48 ft), less than the SuezMax requirement of 55.9 ft (17.0 m) at 59 m (194 ft) beam. Handling equipment at ports was the main constraint on size, rather than the dimensions of canals or straits. The container port handling speed can be 29 moves per hour in Tanger-Med, or 37 in Rotterdam (215 per ship). Anchor and mooring winch systems are being supplied by TTS Marine.

== Market ==
Maersk Line planned to use the ships on routes between Europe and Asia. In 2008, there was a reduction in demand for container transport caused by economic recessions in many countries. This left shipping lines in financial difficulties in 2009, with surplus capacity in their ships. Some ships were laid up or scrapped. However, there was a sudden resurgence of demand for container transport in 2010; Maersk Line posted its largest ever profit, and orders for new ships increased, leading to fresh concerns about future overcapacity. The market was still characterized by overcapacity and decreasing prices for new ships in 2013. China Shipping Container Lines ordered five ships with a capacity of 18,400 TEU from Hyundai Heavy Industries, topping the Triple E class, with delivery from late 2014. United Arab Shipping Company has ordered (also from Hyundai) five slightly larger ships and five ships larger than the Maersk E class. Several other larger ships have been ordered by the industry.

Slow steaming, as used by the Triple E class, is one way of maximizing capacity and reducing fuel consumption. The order for many big ships is a gamble on Maersk's part that Chinese exports will continue to grow. Lack of market growth in the second half of 2012 caused Maersk to postpone a decision on how to use the Triple E class. Five Triple E-class vessels were to be delivered in 2013, with an impact sometime in 2014 with eight or nine Triple E-class vessels operating. Maersk already uses approximately 100 ships on the Asia-Europe route, which is their most important. SeaIntel expects about 46 ships with more than 10,000 TEU each to be delivered worldwide in 2013. The construction of newer, larger ships has influenced development plans at ports such as London Gateway and JadeWeserPort in Wilhelmshaven (Germany), and Algeciras and Tanjung had bigger cranes installed. The maximum number of TEUs carried in one trip was 18,024 in January 2015, in Algeciras, Spain.

== See also ==
- List of world's longest ships
- Malaccamax
