= Mumbai Maersk =

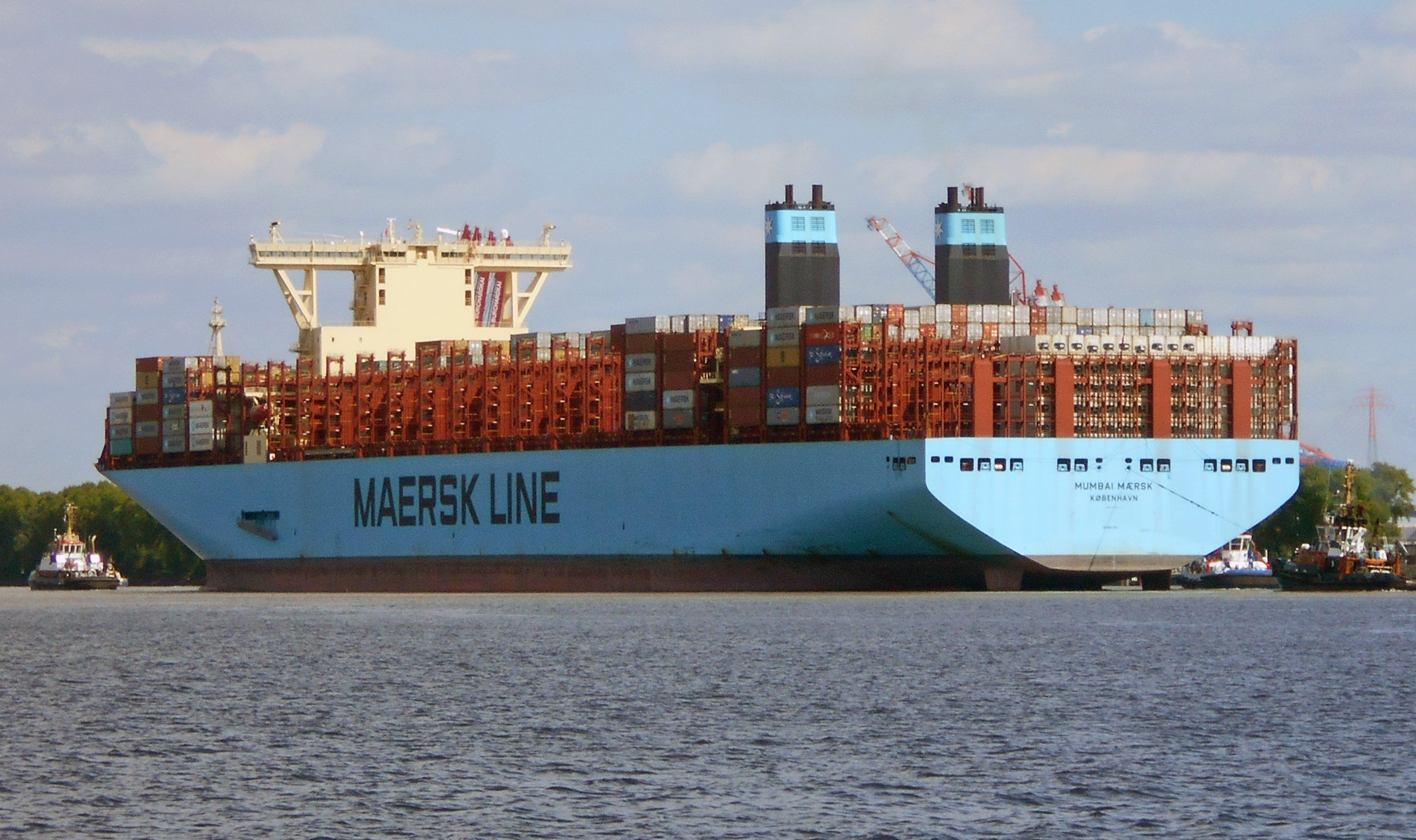
- Mumbai Maersk at Port of Hamburg, 2020
- Name: Mumbai Maersk
- Owner: Maersk Line
- Operator: A.P. Moller–Maersk Group
- Port of registry: Copenhagen, Denmark
- Builder: Daewoo Shipbuilding & Marine Engineering
- Laid down: 2016
- Launched: 2018
- In service: April 2018
- Identification: Call sign: OWNQ2; IMO number: 9780471; MMSI number: 219039000
- Status: In active service

General characteristics
- Class & type: 2nd-gen. Maersk Triple E-class container ship
- Tonnage: 214,286 GT
- Length: 399 m (1,309 ft 1 in)
- Beam: 58 m (190 ft 3 in)
- Draught: 16.5 m (54 ft 2 in)
- Depth: 33.20 m (108 ft 11 in) (deck edge to keel)
- Propulsion: Two shafts, fixed pitch propellers
- Capacity: 20,568 TEU

Mumbai Maersk is a container ship of the Maersk Triple E class. The ship has a capacity of 20,568 TEUs and belongs to Maersk Line. Mumbai Maersk can carry over 18,000 twenty-foot (33 cbm) equivalent containers.

== Havarie ==
The ship ran aground about six kilometres (3.7 mi) north of the island of Wangerooge on the night of February 3, 2022. No injuries were reported among the 30 people on board, no fuel leak sighted and the entrance to the port was not obstructed. The Mumbai Maersk was on its way from Rotterdam in the Weser estuary to Bremerhaven. The German Central Command for Maritime Emergencies (Havariekommando) dispatched tugboats and the multi-purpose ships Neuwerk and Mellum to the distressed vessel. A first attempt to tow the ship into deeper water on the morning of February 3, 2022 by the two multi-purpose vessels and five tugs failed. CCME deployed a number of additional tugs to make a second attempt.

== See also ==
- E-class container ship, the class preceding the Triple E
