= Magleby Maersk =

Ship built in 2014

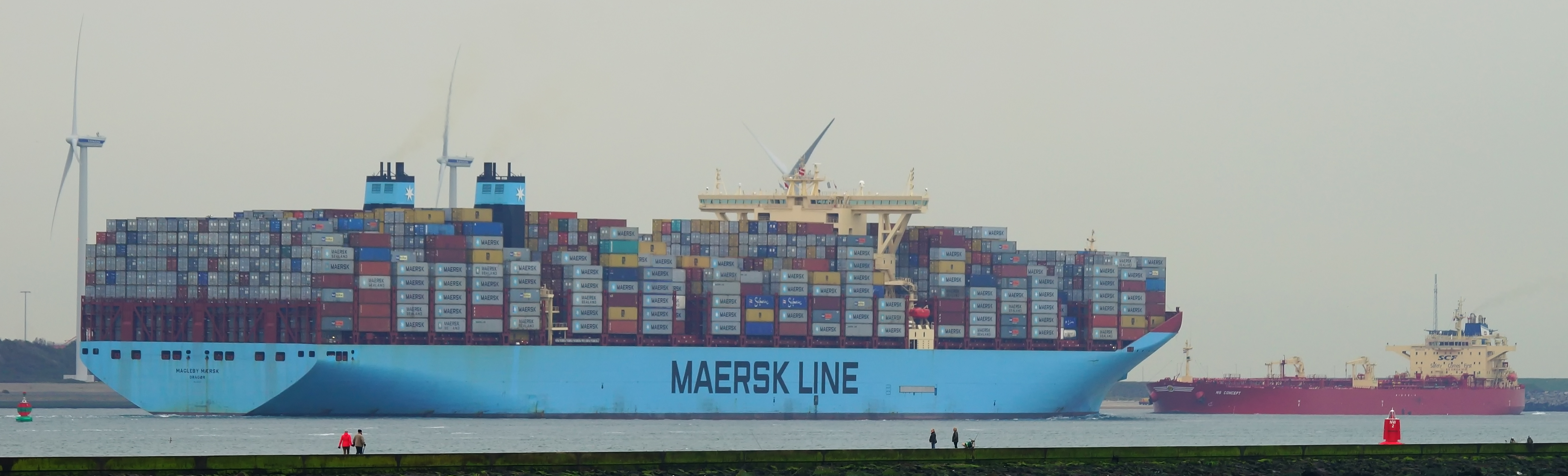

History
- Name: Magleby Maersk
- Operator: Maersk Line
- Port of registry: Denmark
- Builder: Daewoo Shipbuilding & Marine Engineering, Co. Ltd.
- Launched: 5 October 2013
- Identification: Call sign: OWJI2; IMO number: 9619957; MMSI number: 219018986
- Status: In active service

General characteristics
- Class & type: Triple E-class container ship
- Tonnage: 194,849 GT; 194,417 DWT
- Length: 400 m (1,312 ft 4 in)
- Beam: 59 m (193 ft 7 in)
- Draught: 16.0 m (52 ft 6 in)
- Installed power: 59,360 kW
- Propulsion: 2 × MAN-B&W 8S80ME-C 9.2 (2 × 29,680 kW (39,800 hp))
- Speed: 22.0 knots (40.7 km/h; 25.3 mph) (maximum); 16.0 knots (29.6 km/h; 18.4 mph) (cruising)
- Capacity: 18,270 TEU

Magleby Maersk is a Triple E-class container ship and is one of the largest container ships of the world. The vessel was built at the shipyard of Daewoo Shipbuilding & Marine Engineering under yard number 4255. The vessel is owned and operated by the Danish international shipping company Maersk Line, which is the largest operator of container ships in the world. Magleby Maersk has a capacity of 18,270 TEU.

== Design ==
The container ship Magleby Maersk has a length of 398 m (1,305 ft 9 in), a moulded beam of 59 m (193 ft 7 in), a depth of 33 m (108 ft 3 in), a height of 73 m (239 ft 6 in) and a maximum summer draft of 16 m (52 ft 6 in). The gross tonnage of the container carrier is 194,849 GT and the deadweight is 194,417 DWT. With these measurements the vessel has capacity for 18,270 TEU. The vessel is certified by American Bureau of Shipping class.

=== Engineering ===
Magleby Maersk has two long-stroke and low-revolution main engines MAN B&W 8S80ME-C 9.2, each with power of 39,785 horsepower (29,668 kW). The vessel is driven by two four-bladed, fixed-pitch propellers and reach maximum speed over 22.0 knots (40.7 km/h; 25.3 mph). The service and economy speed of operations is 16.0 knots (29.6 km/h; 18.4 mph).

== See also ==
- CSCL Globe
- Largest container shipping companies
