= Jess Søderberg =

Danish businessman (born 1944)

Jess Søderberg (born 12 October 1944, in Copenhagen) is a Danish businessman. He was the CEO of A.P. Moller-Maersk for 14 years from 1993 to 2007. After his departure from A.P. Moller-Maersk, he was vice president of Carlsberg.

He graduated from Holte School in 1963 and later graduated with his MSc from Copenhagen Business School. He is a Knight 1st Class of the Order of Dannebrog.
