= CSCL Globe =

Container ship

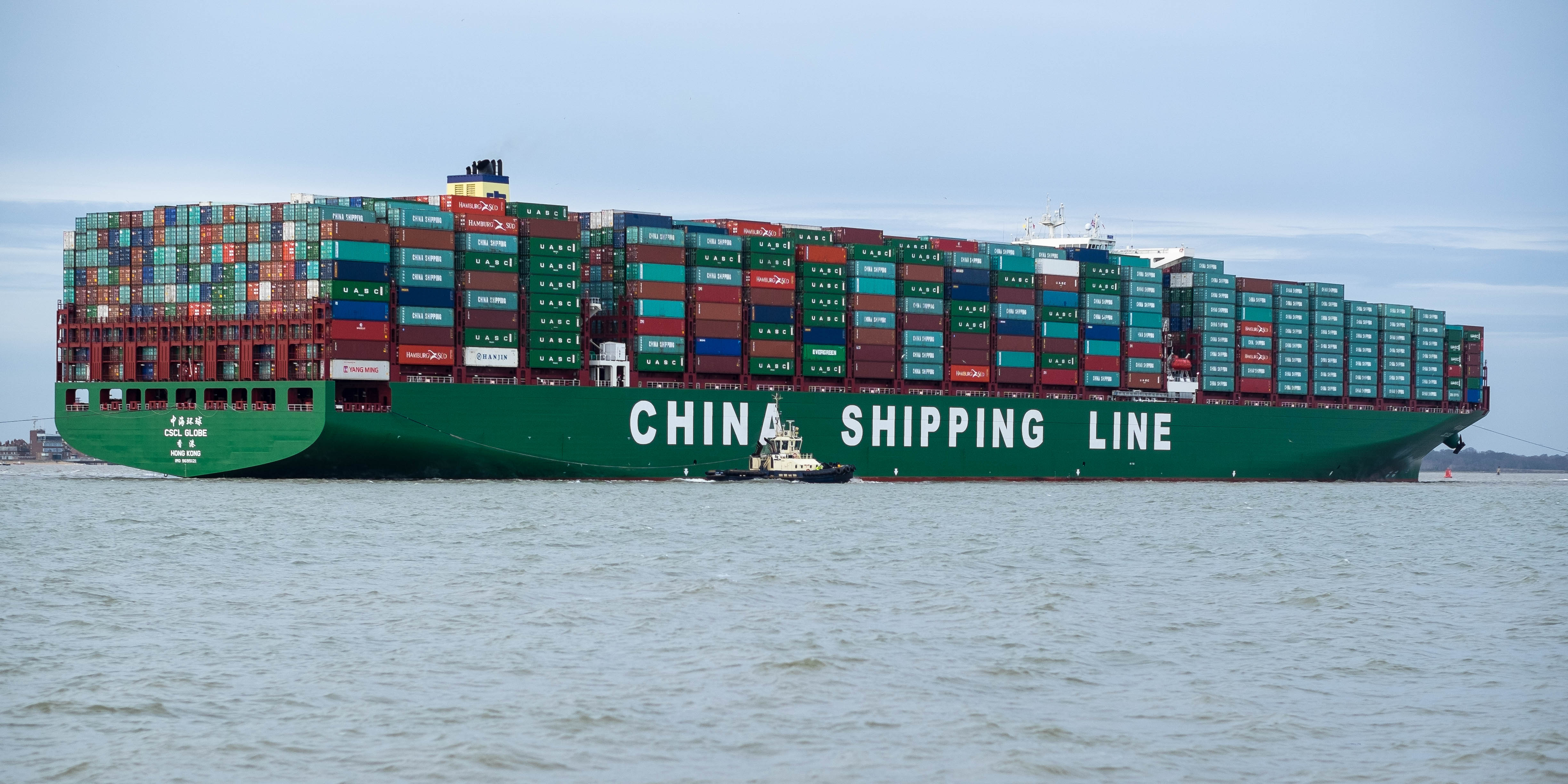
- CSCL Globe arriving at the Port of Felixstowe, England on its maiden voyage in January 2015

History

Hong Kong
- Name: CSCL Globe
- Operator: COSCO Shipping
- Port of registry: Hong Kong
- Ordered: May 2013
- Builder: Hyundai Heavy Industries
- Launched: 23 August 2014
- Maiden voyage: December 2014
- Identification: Call sign: VRNU2; IMO number: 9695121; MMSI number: 477712400
- Status: Operational

General characteristics
- Class & type: Globe-class Container ship
- Tonnage: 187,541 GT; 184,605 DWT
- Length: 400 m (1,312 ft 4 in)
- Beam: 59 m (193 ft 7 in)
- Draft: 16.0 m (52 ft 6 in)
- Installed power: 69,720 kW at 84 rpm
- Propulsion: MAN B&W 12S90ME-C
- Speed: 22.0 knots (41 km/h) (maximum); 20.5 knots (38 km/h) (cruising)
- Capacity: 19,100 TEU
- Crew: 23

CSCL Globe is a container ship owned and operated by COSCO Shipping and previously, China Shipping Container Lines (CSCL). The first of a class of five ships intended for Asia-Europe trade routes, she was the largest container ship in the world at the time of her launch in November 2014, with a maximum capacity of 19,100 twenty-foot containers.

== Construction ==
CSCL Globe and her four sister ships were ordered by CSCL in May 2013. The ship was constructed by Hyundai Heavy Industries at their shipyard in Ulsan, South Korea, with the first steel for the hull cut in January 2014. CSCL Globe completed her sea trials in October 2014, and was delivered to CSCL in November 2014. Upon its entry into service, CSCL Globe superseded Mærsk's Mærsk Mc-Kinney Møller as the world's largest operational container ship.

== Design and engineering ==
CSCL Globe has an overall length of 400 m (1,312 ft), a beam of 59 m (194 ft) and a summer draft of 16.0 m (52.5 ft). With a deadweight of 184,605 DWT and a gross tonnage of 187,541 GT, the vessel can carry 19,100 TEU with 2,000 reefer points. The vessel was constructed to DNV class standards. The ship operates with a crew of 23.

CSCL Globe's main engine is a MAN B&W 12S90ME-C with a total output power of 69,720 kW at 84 rpm. At the time of her completion, the 17-metre (56 ft) tall engine was the largest ship engine ever built. Designed to maximise fuel efficiency while reducing noise and carbon dioxide emissions, it permits the ship a service speed of 20.5 knots (38 km/h), while the maximum speed attained during sea trials exceeded 22.0 knots (41 km/h).

== Career ==
CSCL Globe left Shanghai, China, on her maiden voyage in early December 2014, and arrived at its first port of call – Felixstowe, England – on 7 January 2015. In January 2015, CSCL Globe was superseded as the world's largest container ship by Mediterranean Shipping Company's MSC Oscar, which exceeded her TEU capacity by 124 containers.

After the merger of the ultimate parent company, China Shipping Group, with China Ocean Shipping (Group) Corporation (COSCO), forming China COSCO Shipping, the livery of the ship has changed from "China Shipping Line" to "COSCO Shipping".

== See also ==
- List of largest container ships
- Largest container shipping companies
