= Evergreen F-class container ship =

Series of container ships for Evergreen Marine

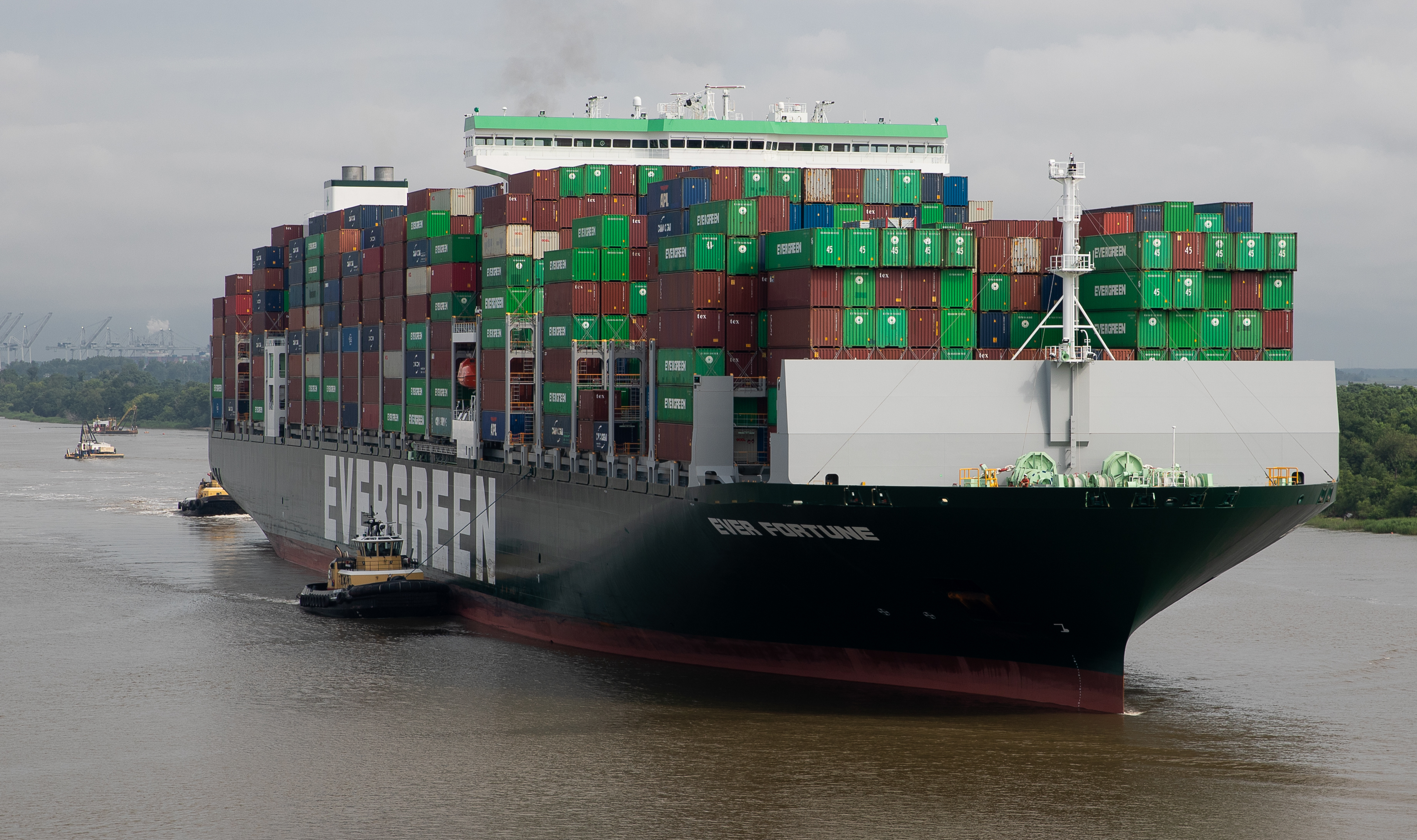
- Ever Fortune on the Savannah River in 2021

Class overview
- Builders: Samsung Heavy Industries (owner for Evergreen Marine); Imabari Shipbuilding (long-term charter from Shoei Kisen Kaisha)
- Operators: Evergreen Marine
- In service: 2020–present
- Planned: 20
- Completed: 20
- Active: 20

General characteristics (SHI)
- Type: Container ship
- Tonnage: 117,340 GT
- Length: 333.96 m (1,096 ft)
- Beam: 48.4 m (159 ft)
- Draft: 16 m (52 ft)
- Capacity: 12,188 TEU

General characteristics (Imabari)
- Type: Container ship
- Tonnage: 116,395 GT
- Length: 333.9 m (1,095 ft)
- Beam: 48.4 m (159 ft)
- Draft: 15.5 m (51 ft)
- Capacity: 11,850 TEU

The Evergreen F class is a series of 20 container ships built for Evergreen Marine. The ships have a maximal theoretical capacity of around 12,100 TEU. The first ship of this class was delivered in 2020 and built by Samsung Heavy Industries in South Korea. Samsung Heavy Industries built eight ships in total. A further 12 ships were built by Imabari Shipbuilding at their Marugame and Hiroshima shipyards with delivery starting in 2021.

== List of ships ==
Ship name	Yard number	IMO number	Delivered	Status	Ref.	Flag	Owner
Samsung Heavy Industries
Ever Faith	2263	9850525	2 March 2020	In service		Panama	GreenCompass Marine S.A.
Ever Focus	2264	9850537	8 June 2020	In service		Panama	GreenCompass Marine S.A.
Ever Front	2265	9850549	10 August 2020	In service		Panama	GreenCompass Marine S.A.
Ever Forward	2266	9850551	28 September 2020	In service		Singapore	Evergreen Marine Corp. (Hong Kong)
Ever Fortune	2267	9850563	30 October 2020	In service		Singapore	Evergreen Marine Corp. (Hong Kong)
Ever Forever	2268	9850575	15 December 2020	In service		Panama	GreenCompass Marine S.A.
Ever Frank	2269	9850587	18 February 2021	In service		Singapore	Evergreen Marine Corp. (Hong Kong)
Ever Future	2270	9850599	26 April 2021	In service		Singapore	Evergreen Marine Corp. (Hong Kong)
Imabari Shipbuilding Marugame Shipyard
Ever Fit	1864	9850795	28 January 2021	In service		Panama	Shoei Kisen Kaisha
Ever Fame	1865	9850800	16 March 2021	In service		Panama	Shoei Kisen Kaisha
Ever Fine	1866	9850812	30 June 2021	In service		Panama	Shoei Kisen Kaisha
Ever Fore	1867	9850824	10 August 2021	In service		Panama	Shoei Kisen Kaisha
Ever Fashion	1868	9850836	11 October 2021	In service		Liberia	Shoei Kisen Kaisha
Ever Fond	1869	9850848	22 December 2021	In service		Liberia	Shoei Kisen Kaisha
Ever Favor	1870	9850850	1 Mar 2022	In service		Liberia	Shoei Kisen Kaisha
Imabari Shipbuilding Hiroshima Shipyard
Ever Far	2671	9850862	15 December 2020	In service		Liberia	Shoei Kisen Kaisha
Ever Fast	2672	9850874	10 February 2021	In service		Liberia	Shoei Kisen Kaisha
Ever Fair	2676	9850886	29 March 2021	In service		Liberia	Shoei Kisen Kaisha
Ever Feat	2677	9850898	25 May 2021	In service		Liberia	Shoei Kisen Kaisha
Ever Full	2678	9850903	10 Mar 2022	In service		Liberia	Shoei Kisen Kaisha
Source: new-ships, ShipmentLink

== See also ==
- Ever Golden-class container ship: Largest container ship of Evergreen Marine prior to 2021
- Ever E-class
- Ever G-class
- Ever S-class
- Ever L-class
- Ever B-class
- Ever A-class: Largest container ship of Evergreen Marine and largest container ship in the world
- Triton-class container ship
- Thalassa Hellas-class container ship
