= Evergreen A-class container ship =

Class of container ship

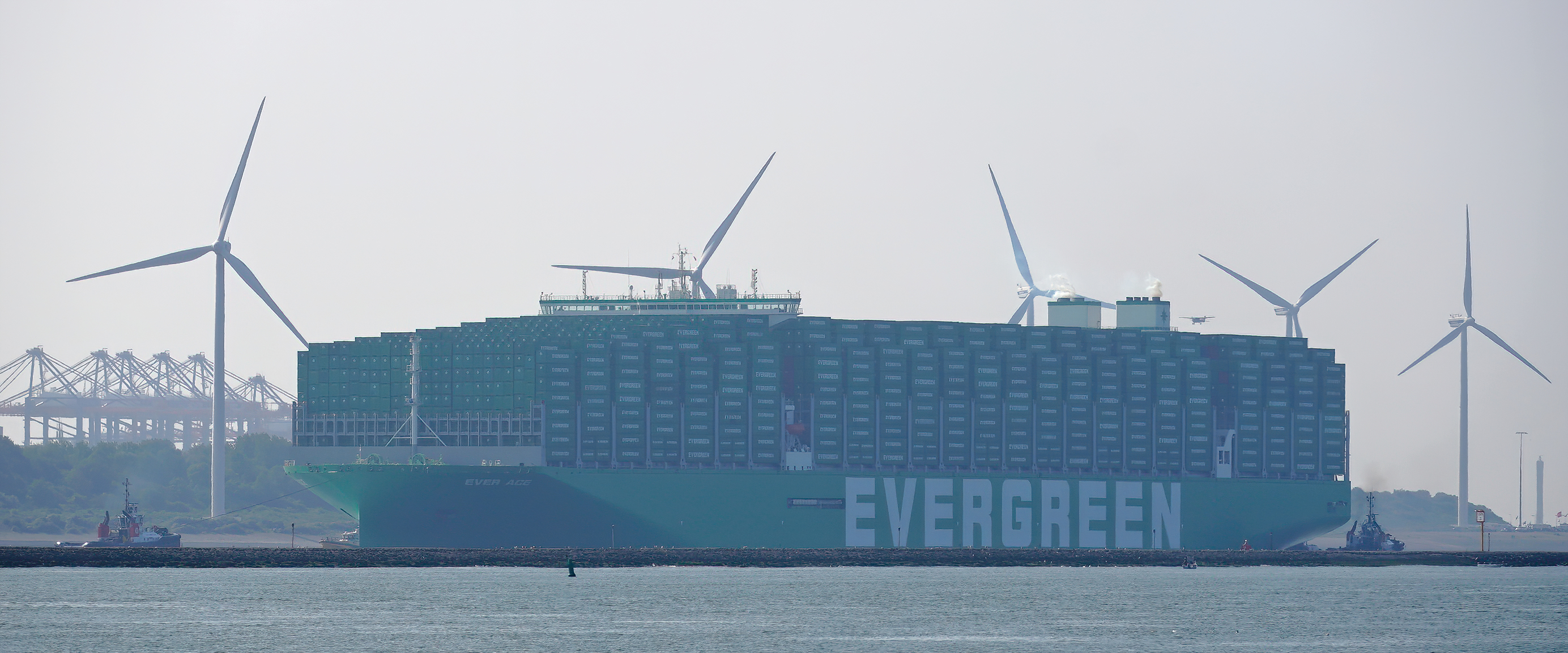
- Ever Ace entering the Port of Rotterdam

Class overview
- Builders: Samsung Heavy Industries; China State Shipbuilding Corporation
- Operators: Evergreen Marine
- Built: 13
- In service: 13
- Planned: 13
- Building: 0
- Completed: 13
- Canceled: 0
- Active: 13
- Laid up: 0
- Lost: 0
- Retired: 0
- Scrapped: 0
- Preserved: 0

General characteristics
- Type: Container ship
- Tonnage: 235,579 GT
- Length: 400 m (1,312 ft 4 in)
- Beam: 61.5 m (202 ft)
- Draught: 17 m (55 ft 9 in)
- Installed power: 58,600 kW (78,584 hp)
- Propulsion: WinGD X92-B, 11 cylinder
- Capacity: 23,992 to 24,004 TEU
- Notes: Post-Panamax

The Evergreen A class (or Ever A) is a series of 13 container ships built for Evergreen Marine. The largest ships have a maximal theoretical capacity of around 24,004 TEU and are among the largest container ships in the world. Six ships were built by Samsung Heavy Industries in South Korea, and another seven were built by China State Shipbuilding Corporation (CSSC) at two shipyards in China.

As of August 2021, the record for most containers loaded onto a single ship is held by the Ever Ace, which carried a total of 21,710 TEU of containers from Yantian to Europe.

== List of ships ==
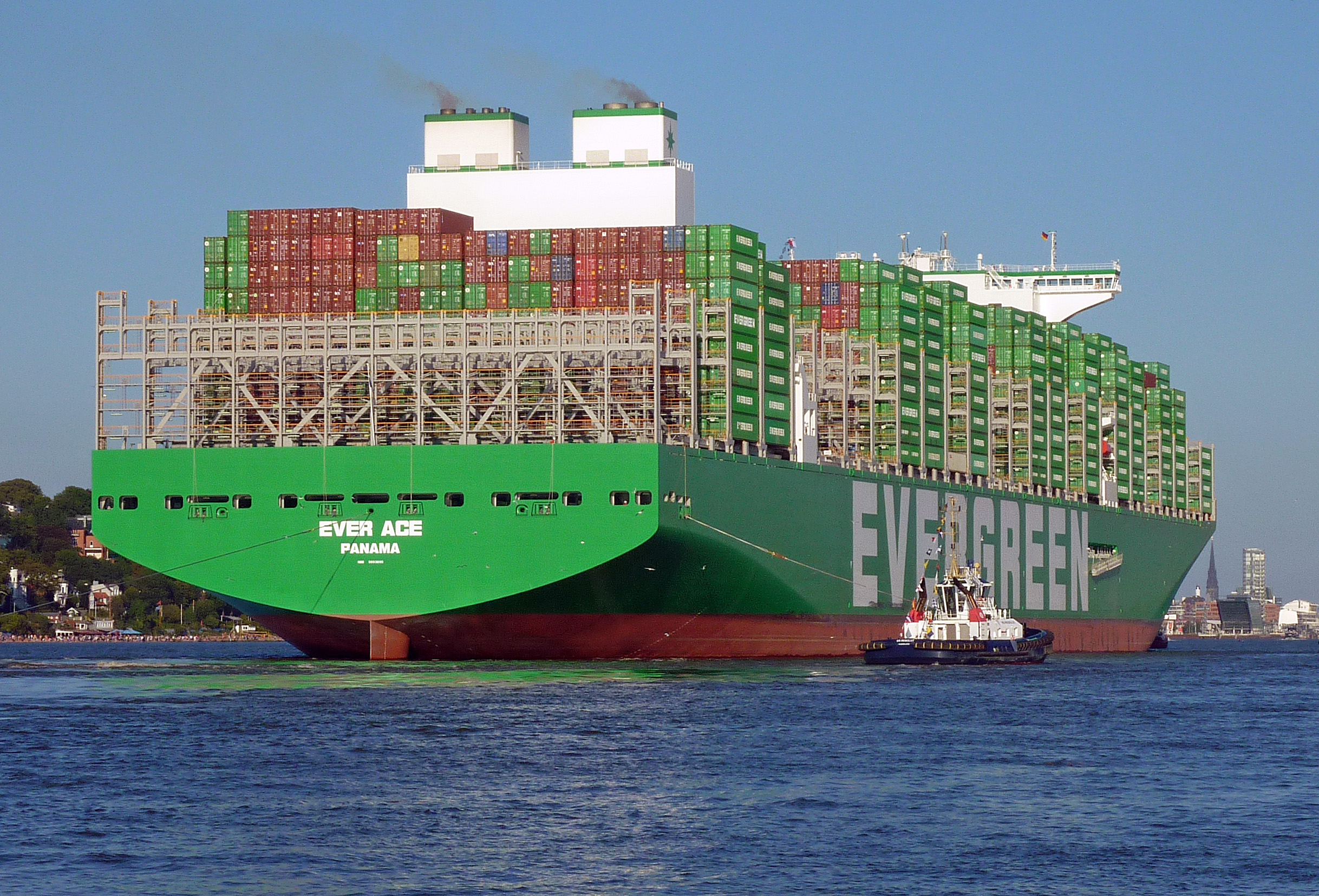
Stern view of Ever Ace in Hamburg, 2021

Ship	Yard number	IMO number	Delivered	Status	Flag	Owner	Ref
Samsung Heavy Industries (23992 TEU)
Ever Ace	2358	9893890	28 July 2021	In service	Panama	GreenCompass Marine S.A.	
Ever Act	2359	9893905	10 September 2021	In service	Panama	GreenCompass Marine S.A.	
Ever Aim	2360	9893917	28 October 2021	In service	Panama	GreenCompass Marine S.A.	
Ever Alp	2361	9893929	9 December 2021	In service	Panama	GreenCompass Marine S.A.	
Ever Arm	2362	9893931	10 March 2022	In service	Taiwan	Evergreen Marine Corp. (Taiwan) Ltd.	
Ever Art	2363	9893943	19 May 2022	In service	Taiwan	Evergreen Marine Corp. (Taiwan) Ltd.	
Jiangnan Shipyard (24004 TEU)
Ever Apex	2630	9893979	11 July 2022	In service	Singapore	Evergreen Marine (Asia) Pte. Ltd.	
Ever Atop	2631	9893993	28 October 2022	In service	Singapore	Evergreen Marine (Asia) Pte. Ltd.	
Hudong-Zhonghua Shipbuilding (24004 TEU)
Ever Alot	1858	9893955	22 June 2022	In service	Panama	GreenCompass Marine S.A.	
Ever Aria	1859	9909132	13 September 2022	In service	Panama	GreenCompass Marine S.A.	
Ever Acme	1872	9943267	30 December 2022	In service	Singapore	Evergreen Marine (Asia) Pte Ltd.	
Ever Aeon	1873	9943279	September 2024	In service	Singapore	Evergreen Marine (Asia) Pte Ltd.	
Ever Ally	1878	9975791	October 2025	In service	Singapore	Evergreen Marine (Asia) Pte Ltd.	
Source: new-ships, ShipmentLink

== See also ==
- Ever G-class
- Ever E-class
- Ever S-class
- Ever L-class
- Ever B-class
- Ever F-class
- Ever M-class
- HMM Algeciras-class
- Triton-class container ship
- Thalassa Hellas-class container ship
