= List of largest container ships =

This is a list of container ships with a capacity larger than 20,000 twenty-foot equivalent units (TEU).

Container ships have been built in increasingly larger sizes to take advantage of economies of scale and reduce expense as part of intermodal freight transport. Container ships are also subject to certain limitations in size. Primarily, these are the availability of sufficiently large main engines and the availability of a sufficient number of ports and terminals prepared and equipped to handle ultra-large container ships. Furthermore, some of the world's main waterways such as the Suez Canal and Singapore Strait restrict the maximum dimensions of a ship that can pass through them.

In 2016, Prokopowicz and Berg-Andreassen defined a container ship with a capacity of 10,000 to 20,000 TEU as a Very Large Container Ship (VLCS), and one with a capacity greater than 20,000 TEU as an Ultra Large Container Ship (ULCS).

In September 2025, the record for most containers loaded onto a single ship is held by the One Innovation, which carried a total of 22,233 TEU of containers from Singapore to Felixstowe (England).

As of January 2024, the record for the largest container ship is held by MSC's Irina-class with the capacity of 24,346 TEU.

== Completed ships ==
Built	Name	Length overall		Beam		Maximum TEU	GT	Operator	Flag	Image	Remarks and references
Built	Name	(m)	(ft)	(m)	(ft)	Maximum TEU	GT	Operator	Flag	Image	Remarks and references
2023	MSC Irina	399.9	1,312	61.3	201.1	24,346	233,328	MSC (Switzerland)	Liberia		
2023	MSC Loreto	399.9	1,312	61.3	201.1	24,346	233,328	MSC (Switzerland)	Liberia		
2023	MSC Michel Cappellini	399.9	1,312	61.3	201.1	24,346	233,328	MSC (Switzerland)	Liberia		
2023	MSC Mariella	399.9	1,312	61.3	201.1	24,346	233,328	MSC (Switzerland)	Liberia		
2023	MSC Micol	399.9	1,312	61.3	201.1	24,346	233,328	MSC (Switzerland)	Liberia		
2023	MSC Türkiye	399.9	1,312	61.3	201.1	24,346	233,328	MSC (Switzerland)	Liberia		
2026	CMA CGM Notre Dame	399.9	1,312	61.3	201.1	24,212	236,800	CMA CGM (France)	France		
2026	CMA CGM Pantheon	399.9	1,312	61.3	201.1	24,212	236,800	CMA CGM (France)	France		
2023	OOCL Piraeus	399.9	1,312	61.3	201.1	24,188	235,341	OOCL (Hong Kong)	Hong Kong		
2023	OOCL Turkiye	399.9	1,312	61.3	201.1	24,188	235,341	OOCL (Hong Kong)	Hong Kong		
2023	OOCL Felixstowe	399.9	1,312	61.3	201.1	24,188	235,341	OOCL (Hong Kong)	Hong Kong		
2023	OOCL Zeebrugge	399.9	1,312	61.3	201.1	24,188	235,341	OOCL (Hong Kong)	Hong Kong		
2023	OOCL Gdynia	399.9	1,312	61.3	201.1	24,188	235,341	OOCL (Hong Kong)	Hong Kong		
2024	OOCL Valencia	399.9	1,312	61.3	201.1	24,188	235,341	OOCL (Hong Kong)	Hong Kong		
2024	OOCL Abu Dhabi	399.99	1,312.3	61.3	201.1	24,188	235,341	OOCL (Hong Kong)	Hong Kong		
2026	OOCL Wisdom	399.99	1,312.3	61.3	201.1	24,168	236,000	OOCL (Hong Kong)	Hong Kong		
2023	ONE Innovation	399.95	1,312.2	61.4	201.4	24,136	235,311	ONE (Japan)	Liberia		
2023	ONE Infinity	399.95	1,312.2	61.4	201.4	24,136	235,311	ONE (Japan)	Liberia		
2023	ONE Integrity	399.95	1,312.2	61.4	201.4	24,136	235,311	ONE (Japan)	Liberia		
2023	ONE Inspiration	399.95	1,312.2	61.4	201.4	24,136	235,311	ONE (Japan)	Liberia		
2023	ONE Ingenuity	399.95	1,312.2	61.4	201.4	24,136	235,311	ONE (Japan)	Liberia		
2023	ONE Intelligence	399.95	1,312.2	61.4	201.4	24,136	235,311	ONE (Japan)	Liberia		
2023	MSC Tessa	399.9	1,312	61.5	202	24,116	230,757	MSC (Switzerland)	Liberia		
2023	MSC Celestino Maresca	399.9	1,312	61.5	202	24,116	230,757	MSC (Switzerland)	Liberia		
2023	MSC Gemma	399.9	1,312	61.5	202	24,116	230,757	MSC (Switzerland)	Liberia		
2023	MSC Mette	399.9	1,312	61.5	202	24,116	230,757	MSC (Switzerland)	Liberia		
2023	MSC Claude Girardet	399.9	1,312	61.5	202	24,116	230,757	MSC (Switzerland)	Liberia		
2023	MSC Nicola Mastro	399.9	1,312	61.5	202	24,116	230,757	MSC (Switzerland)	Liberia		
2023	MSC China	399.9	1,312	61.5	202	24,116	230,757	MSC (Switzerland)	Liberia		
2023	MSC Raya	399.9	1,312	61.5	202	24,116	230,757	MSC (Switzerland)	Liberia		
2022	Ever Alot	399.9	1,312	61.5	202	24,004	236,228	Evergreen (Taiwan)	Panama		
2022	Ever Apex	399.9	1,312	61.5	202	24,004	236,228	Evergreen (Taiwan)	Panama		
2022	Ever Aria	399.9	1,312	61.5	202	24,004	236,228	Evergreen (Taiwan)	Panama		
2022	Ever Atop	399.9	1,312	61.5	202	24,004	236,228	Evergreen (Taiwan)	Singapore		
2022	Ever Acme	399.9	1,312	61.5	202	24,004	236,228	Evergreen (Taiwan)	Singapore		
2021	Ever Ace	399.9	1,312	61.5	202	23,992	235,579	Evergreen (Taiwan)	Panama		
2021	Ever Act	399.9	1,312	61.5	202	23,992	235,579	Evergreen (Taiwan)	Panama		
2021	Ever Aim	399.9	1,312	61.5	202	23,992	235,579	Evergreen (Taiwan)	Panama		
2021	Ever Alp	399.9	1,312	61.5	202	23,992	235,579	Evergreen (Taiwan)	Panama		
2022	Ever Arm	399.9	1,312	61.5	202	23,992	235,579	Evergreen (Taiwan)	Taiwan		
2022	Ever Art	399.9	1,312	61.5	202	23,992	235,579	Evergreen (Taiwan)	Taiwan		
2020	HMM Algeciras	399.9	1,312	61.0	200.1	23,964	228,283	HMM (South Korea)	Panama		
2020	HMM Copenhagen	399.9	1,312	61.0	200.1	23,964	228,283	HMM (South Korea)	Panama		
2020	HMM Dublin	399.9	1,312	61.0	200.1	23,964	228,283	HMM (South Korea)	Panama		
2020	HMM Gdansk	399.9	1,312	61.0	200.1	23,964	228,283	HMM (South Korea)	Panama		
2020	HMM Hamburg	399.9	1,312	61.0	200.1	23,964	228,283	HMM (South Korea)	Panama		
2020	HMM Helsinki	399.9	1,312	61.0	200.1	23,964	228,283	HMM (South Korea)	Panama		
2020	HMM Le Havre	399.9	1,312	61.0	200.1	23,964	228,283	HMM (South Korea)	Panama		
2025	CMA CGM Seine	399.9	1,312	61.3	201	23,876	236,583	CMA CGM (France)	Singapore		
2020	HMM Oslo	399.9	1,312	61.5	202	23,820	232,311	HMM (South Korea)	Panama		
2020	HMM Rotterdam	399.9	1,312	61.5	202	23,820	232,311	HMM (South Korea)	Panama		
2020	HMM Southampton	399.9	1,312	61.5	202	23,820	232,311	HMM (South Korea)	Panama		
2020	HMM Stockholm	399.9	1,312	61.5	202	23,820	232,311	HMM (South Korea)	Panama		
2020	HMM St Petersburg	399.9	1,312	61.5	202	23,820	232,311	HMM (South Korea)	Panama		
2019	MSC Gülsün	399.9	1,312	61.5	202	23,756	232,618	MSC (Switzerland)	Panama		
2019	MSC Samar	399.9	1,312	61.5	202	23,756	232,618	MSC (Switzerland)	Panama		
2019	MSC Leni	399.9	1,312	61.5	202	23,756	232,618	MSC (Switzerland)	Panama		
2019	MSC Mia	399.9	1,312	61.5	202	23,756	232,618	MSC (Switzerland)	Panama		
2019	MSC Febe	399.9	1,312	61.5	202	23,756	232,618	MSC (Switzerland)	Panama		
2020	MSC Ambra	399.9	1,312	61.5	202	23,756	232,618	MSC (Switzerland)	Panama		
2023	Berlin Express	399.9	1,312	61	200	23,664	229,376	Hapag-Lloyd (Germany)	Germany		
2023	Manila Express	399.9	1,312	61	200	23,664	229,376	Hapag-Lloyd (Germany)	Germany		
2023	Hanoi Express	399.9	1,312	61	200	23,664	229,376	Hapag-Lloyd (Germany)	Germany		
2024	Busan Express	399.9	1,312	61	200	23,664	229,376	Hapag-Lloyd (Germany)	Germany		
2024	Singapore Express	399.9	1,312	61	200	23,664	229,376	Hapag-Lloyd (Germany)	Germany		
2024	Damietta Express	399.9	1,312	61	200	23,664	229,376	Hapag-Lloyd (Germany)	Germany		
2024	Hamburg Express	399.9	1,312	61	200	23,664	229,376	Hapag-Lloyd (Germany)	Germany		
2024	Gdansk Express	399.9	1,312	61	200	23,664	229,376	Hapag-Lloyd (Germany)	Germany		
2024	Rotterdam Express	399.9	1,312	61	200	23,664	229,376	Hapag-Lloyd (Germany)	Germany		
2025	Bangkok Express	399.9	1,312	61	200	23,664	229,376	Hapag-Lloyd (Germany)	Germany		
2025	Genova Express	399.9	1,312	61	200	23,664	229,376	Hapag-Lloyd (Germany)	Germany		
2025	Wilhelmshaven Express	399.9	1,312	61	200	23,664	229,376	Hapag-Lloyd (Germany)	Germany		
2019	MSC Mina	399.8	1,312	61.0	200.1	23,656	228,741	MSC (Switzerland)	Panama		
2019	MSC Isabella	399.8	1,312	61.0	200.1	23,656	228,741	MSC (Switzerland)	Panama		
2019	MSC Arina	399.8	1,312	61.0	200.1	23,656	228,741	MSC (Switzerland)	Panama		
2019	MSC Nela	399.8	1,312	61.0	200.1	23,656	228,741	MSC (Switzerland)	Panama		
2019	MSC Sixin	399.8	1,312	61.0	200.1	23,656	228,741	MSC (Switzerland)	Panama		
2021	MSC Apolline	399.8	1,312	61.0	200.1	23,656	228,786	MSC (Switzerland)	Liberia		
2021	MSC Amelia	399.8	1,312	61.0	200.1	23,656	228,786	MSC (Switzerland)	Liberia		
2021	MSC Diletta	399.8	1,312	61.0	200.1	23,656	228,786	MSC (Switzerland)	Liberia		
2021	MSC Michelle	399.8	1,312	61.0	200.1	23,656	228,786	MSC (Switzerland)	Liberia		
2021	MSC Allegra	399.8	1,312	61.0	200.1	23,656	228,786	MSC (Switzerland)	Liberia		
2020	CMA CGM Jacques Saadé	399.9	1,312	61.3	201	23,112	236,583	CMA CGM (France)	France		
2020	CMA CGM Champs Elysées	399.9	1,312	61.3	201	23,112	236,583	CMA CGM (France)	France		
2020	CMA CGM Palais Royal	399.9	1,312	61.3	201	23,112	236,583	CMA CGM (France)	France		
2020	CMA CGM Louvre	399.9	1,312	61.3	201	23,112	236,583	CMA CGM (France)	France		
2021	CMA CGM Rivoli	399.9	1,312	61.3	201	23,112	236,583	CMA CGM (France)	France		
2021	CMA CGM Montmartre	399.9	1,312	61.3	201	23,112	236,583	CMA CGM (France)	France		
2021	CMA CGM Concorde	399.9	1,312	61.3	201	23,112	236,583	CMA CGM (France)	France		
2021	CMA CGM Trocadero	399.9	1,312	61.3	201	23,112	236,583	CMA CGM (France)	France		
2021	CMA CGM Sorbonne	399.9	1,312	61.3	201	23,112	236,583	CMA CGM (France)	France		
2017	OOCL Hong Kong	399.9	1,312	58.8	193	21,413	210,890	OOCL (Hong Kong)	Hong Kong		
2017	OOCL Germany	399.9	1,312	58.8	193	21,413	210,890	OOCL (Hong Kong)	Hong Kong		
2017	OOCL Japan	399.9	1,312	58.8	193	21,413	210,890	OOCL (Hong Kong)	Hong Kong		
2017	OOCL United Kingdom	399.9	1,312	58.8	193	21,413	210,890	OOCL (Hong Kong)	Hong Kong		
2017	OOCL Scandinavia	399.9	1,312	58.8	193	21,413	210,890	OOCL (Hong Kong)	Hong Kong		
2018	OOCL Indonesia	399.9	1,312	58.8	193	21,413	210,890	OOCL (Hong Kong)	Hong Kong		
2018	COSCO Shipping Universe	400.0	1,312.3	58.6	192	21,237	215,553	COSCO (China)	Hong Kong		
2018	COSCO Shipping Nebula	400.0	1,312.3	58.6	192	21,237	215,553	COSCO (China)	Hong Kong		
2019	COSCO Shipping Galaxy	400.0	1,312.3	58.6	192	21,237	215,553	COSCO (China)	Hong Kong		
2019	COSCO Shipping Solar	400.0	1,312.3	58.6	192	21,237	215,553	COSCO (China)	Hong Kong		
2019	COSCO Shipping Star	400.0	1,312.3	58.6	192	21,237	215,553	COSCO (China)	Hong Kong		
2019	COSCO Shipping Planet	400.0	1,312.3	58.6	192	21,237	215,553	COSCO (China)	Hong Kong		
2018	CMA CGM Antoine de Saint Exupéry	400.0	1,312.3	59.0	193.6	20,954	219,277	CMA CGM (France)	France		
2018	CMA CGM Jean Mermoz	400.0	1,312.3	59.0	193.6	20,954	219,277	CMA CGM (France)	Malta		
2018	CMA CGM Louis Blériot	400.0	1,312.3	59.0	193.6	20,954	219,277	CMA CGM (France)	Malta		
2017	Madrid Maersk	399.0	1,309.1	58.6	192	20,568	214,286	Maersk (Denmark)	Denmark		
2017	Munich Maersk	399.0	1,309.1	58.6	192	20,568	214,286	Maersk (Denmark)	Denmark		
2017	Moscow Maersk	399.0	1,309.1	58.6	192	20,568	214,286	Maersk (Denmark)	Denmark		
2017	Milan Maersk	399.0	1,309.1	58.6	192	20,568	214,286	Maersk (Denmark)	Denmark		
2017	Monaco Maersk	399.0	1,309.1	58.6	192	20,568	214,286	Maersk (Denmark)	Denmark		
2018	Marseille Maersk	399.0	1,309.1	58.6	192	20,568	214,286	Maersk (Denmark)	Denmark		
2018	Manchester Maersk	399.0	1,309.1	58.6	192	20,568	214,286	Maersk (Denmark)	Denmark		
2018	Murcia Maersk	399.0	1,309.1	58.6	192	20,568	214,286	Maersk (Denmark)	Denmark		
2018	Manila Maersk	399.0	1,309.1	58.6	192	20,568	214,286	Maersk (Denmark)	Denmark		
2018	Mumbai Maersk	399.0	1,309.1	58.6	192	20,568	214,286	Maersk (Denmark)	Denmark		
2019	Maastricht Maersk	399.0	1,309.1	58.6	192	20,568	214,286	Maersk (Denmark)	Denmark		
2017	MOL Truth	399.0	1,309.1	58.0	190.3	20,182	210,691	ONE (Japan)	Panama		
2018	MOL Treasure	399.0	1,309.1	58.0	190.3	20,182	210,691	ONE (Japan)	Panama		
2017	MOL Triumph	400.0	1,312.3	58.8	193	20,170	210,678	ONE (Japan)	Marshall Islands		
2017	MOL Trust	400.0	1,312.3	58.8	193	20,170	210,678	ONE (Japan)	Marshall Islands		
2017	MOL Tribute	400.0	1,312.3	58.8	193	20,170	210,678	ONE (Japan)	Marshall Islands		
2017	MOL Tradition	400.0	1,312.3	58.8	193	20,170	210,678	ONE (Japan)	Marshall Islands		
2019	Ever Glory	400.0	1,312.3	58.8	193	20,160	219,775	Evergreen (Taiwan)	Liberia		
2019	Ever Govern	400.0	1,312.3	58.8	193	20,160	219,688	Evergreen (Taiwan)	Panama		
2019	Ever Globe	400.0	1,312.3	58.8	193	20,160	219,775	Evergreen (Taiwan)	Panama		
2019	Ever Greet	400.0	1,312.3	58.8	193	20,160	219,688	Evergreen (Taiwan)	Panama		
2018	Ever Golden	400.0	1,312.3	58.8	193	20,124	219,079	Evergreen (Taiwan)	Panama		
2018	Ever Goods	400.0	1,312.3	58.8	193	20,124	219,079	Evergreen (Taiwan)	Panama		
2018	Ever Genius	400.0	1,312.3	58.8	193	20,124	219,400	Evergreen (Taiwan)	Panama		
2018	Ever Given	400.0	1,312.3	58.8	193	20,124	219,079	Evergreen (Taiwan)	Panama		
2018	Ever Gifted	400.0	1,312.3	58.8	193	20,124	219,352	Evergreen (Taiwan)	Singapore		
2019	Ever Grade	400.0	1,312.3	58.8	193	20,124	219,158	Evergreen (Taiwan)	Panama		
2019	Ever Gentle	400.0	1,312.3	58.8	193	20,124	217,612	Evergreen (Taiwan)	Liberia		
2018	COSCO Shipping Taurus	399.8	1,312	58.7	193	20,119	194,864	COSCO (China)	Hong Kong		
2018	COSCO Shipping Gemini	399.9	1,312	58.7	193	20,119	194,864	COSCO (China)	Hong Kong		
2018	COSCO Shipping Virgo	399.9	1,312	58.7	193	20,119	194,864	COSCO (China)	Hong Kong		
2018	COSCO Shipping Libra	399.7	1,311	58.7	193	20,119	194,864	COSCO (China)	Hong Kong		
2018	COSCO Shipping Sagittarius	399.7	1,311	58.7	193	20,119	194,864	COSCO (China)	Hong Kong		

== Ships on order ==
Delivery	Operator	Number	Maximum TEU	Source
2023	Mediterranean Shipping Company	4x Hudong-Zhonghua Shipbuilding; 4x Jiangnan Shipyard; 2x Yangzijiang Shipbuilding	24,346	
2023	Ocean Network Express	6x Imabari Shipbuilding and Japan Marine United	24,000	
2023	Seaspan ULC	2x; 6 — 10 car carriers Shanghai Waigaoqiao Shipbuilding	24,000	
2022	Evergreen	6x Samsung Heavy Industries	23,992	
2022	Evergreen	4x Jiangnan Shipyard; 4x Hudong-Zhonghua Shipbuilding	24,004	
2023	Hapag-Lloyd	12x Daewoo Shipbuilding & Marine Engineering	23,500+	
2023	OOCL	6x Nantong COSCO KHI Ship Engineering; 6x Dalian COSCO KHI Ship Engineering	23,000	

== Container loading records ==
Date of departure	Ship	TEU	Port	Destination	Ref.
September 2025	One Innovation	22,233	Singapore	Felixstowe	
14 February 2024	One Infinity	22,206	Singapore	Rotterdam	
14 January 2024	One Intelligence	22,202	Singapore	Rotterdam	
31 December 2023	One Inspiration	22,159	Singapore	Rotterdam	
21 December 2023	One Ingenuity	22,071	Singapore	Rotterdam	
14 December 2023	One Innovation	22,000	Singapore	Rotterdam	
13 November 2023	One Integrity	21,954	Singapore	Rotterdam	
14 August 2021	Ever Ace	21,710	Yantian	Rotterdam	
8 April 2021	CMA CGM Jacques Saadé	21,433	Singapore	Le Havre	
12 October 2020	CMA CGM Jacques Saadé	20,723	Singapore	Le Havre	
8 May 2020	HMM Algeciras	19,621	Yantian	Rotterdam	
28 July 2019	MSC Gülsün	19,574	Tanjung Pelepas	Algeciras	
1 June 2019	Monaco Maersk	19,284	Tanjung Pelepas	Rotterdam	
11 February 2019	MOL Tribute	19,190	Singapore	Southampton	
August 2018	Mumbai Maersk	19,038	Tanjung Pelepas	Rotterdam	

== See also ==
- List of largest container shipping companies
- List of largest cruise ships
- List of largest ships by gross tonnage
- List of longest ships
