= CMA CGM Butterfly =

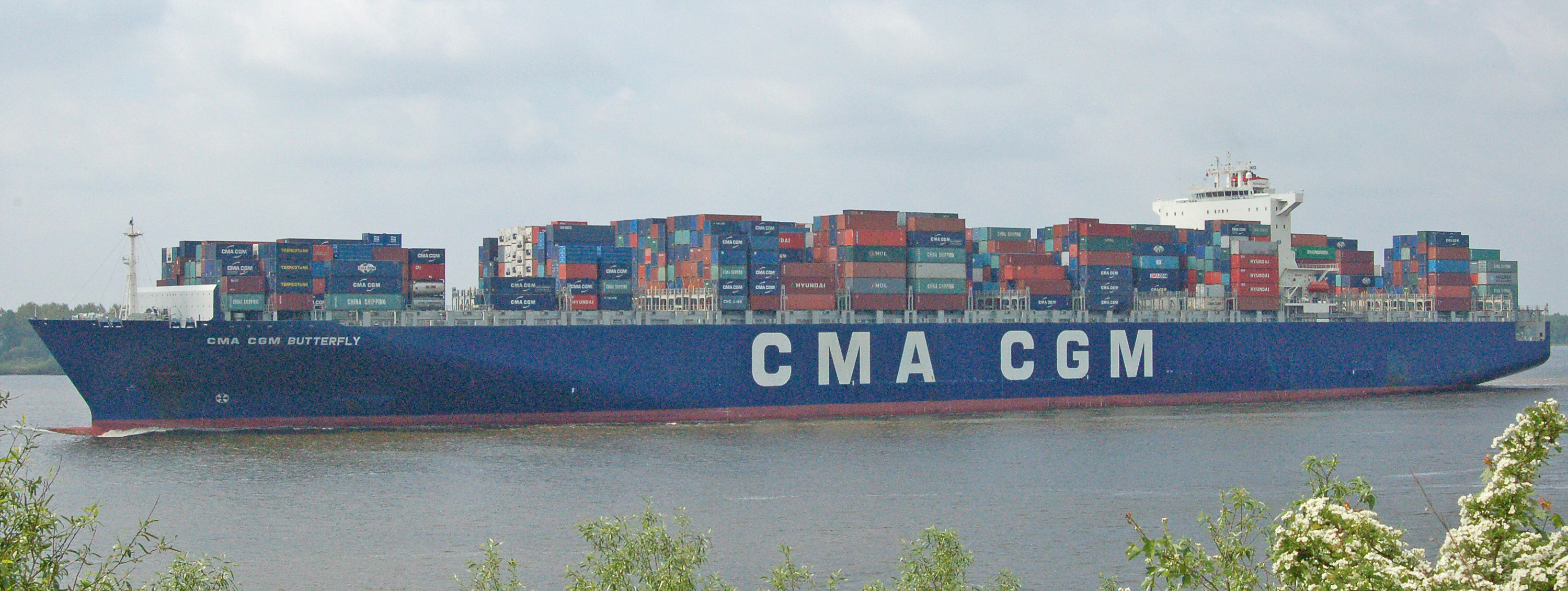
- CMA CGM Butterfly

History
- Name: CMA CGM Butterfly
- Owner: KG MS 'CPO Santa Lorena' Offen Reederei GmbH & Co
- Operator: Reederei Claus-Peter Offen Reederei GmbH & Co
- Port of registry: Monrovia, Liberia
- Builder: Hyundai Heavy Industries
- Yard number: 1892
- Launched: 26 September 2008
- Completed: November 2008
- Identification: IMO number: 9365790; Call sign: A8N08; MMSI number: 636091420; Official No: 91420
- Status: In service

General characteristics
- Class & type: GL
- Length: 350.0 m (1,148.3 ft)
- Beam: 42.8 m (140 ft)
- Draught: 15 m (49 ft)
- Depth: 27.30 m
- Installed power: 68,639 kW (93,322 hp)
- Propulsion: 1 oil engine driving 1 FP propeller
- Speed: 25.3 knots (46.9 km/h; 29.1 mph)

CMA CGM Butterfly is one of the largest container ships in the world. It is one of the largest ships in the French company's fleet, built in South Korea. The ship went around Africa (adding seven days to the trip) to avoid a $600,000 toll for the 9,660 TEU ship passing through the Suez Canal. CMA CGM Butterfly is one of the last generation of 9,700 teu ships.

CMA CGM Butterfly was built by Hyundai Heavy Industries, and completed in 2008. Its total maximum cargo capacity is 9661 TEU. The ship is 337 m in length and has a beam of 42.8 m.

The cargo vessel is powered by Wärtsilä 12RTA96C, a 2 stroke 12 cylinder engine, capable or generating a total power of 68,639 kW (93,322 hp) driving 1 fixed prop propeller.
