= Ever Given =

Container ship that blocked the Suez Canal

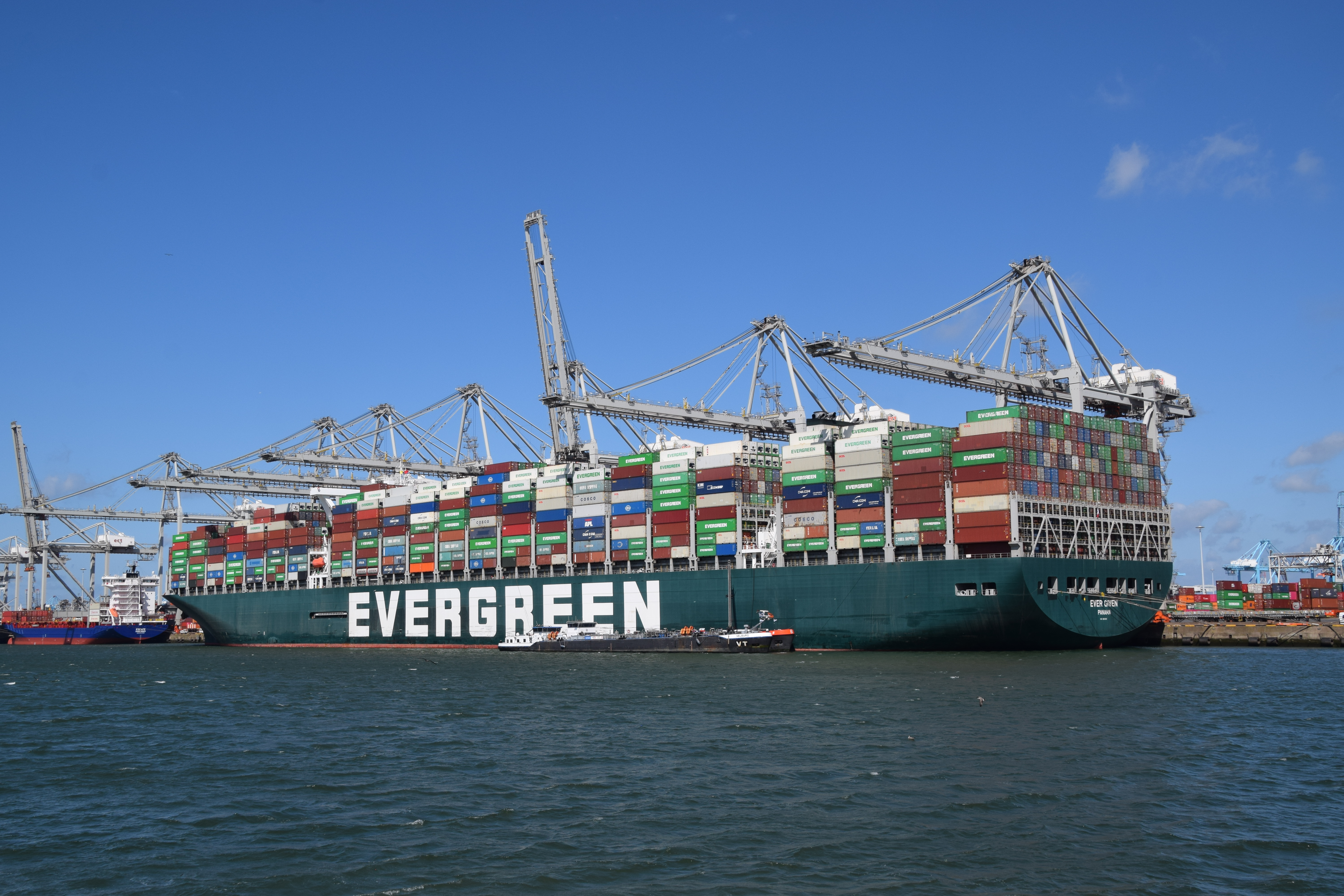
- Ever Given at the ECT Delta terminal (Amazonehaven) 29 July 2021 in the Port of Rotterdam

History
- Name: Ever Given (Note: The name "EVERGREEN" written in large capital letters on both sides of the hull refers to Evergreen Marine, the Taiwanese company that charters the ship. The name of the ship is written in smaller letters on the stern and on both sides of the bow.)
- Owner: Shoei Kisen Kaisha
- Operator: Evergreen Marine
- Port of registry: Panama City, Panama
- Builder: Imabari Shipbuilding (Marugame, Japan)
- Yard number: S-1833
- Laid down: 25 December 2015
- Launched: 9 May 2018
- Completed: 25 September 2018
- Identification: IMO number: 9811000; MMSI number: 353136000; Call sign: H3RC
- Status: In service

General characteristics
- Type: Container ship
- Tonnage: 220,940 GT; 99,155 NT; 199,629 DWT
- Displacement: 265,876 t (261,677 long tons)
- Length: 399.94 m (1,312 ft 2 in)
- Beam: 58.8 m (192 ft 11 in)
- Draught: 14.5 m (47 ft 7 in) (design); 16.0 m (52 ft 6 in) (maximum)
- Depth: 32.9 m (107 ft 11 in)
- Installed power: Mitsui–MAN B&W 11G95ME-C9 (59,300 kW)
- Propulsion: Single shaft; fixed pitch propeller; Two bow thrusters
- Speed: 22.8 knots (42.2 km/h; 26.2 mph)
- Capacity: 20,124 TEU
- Crew: 25

Ever Given
- Traditional Chinese: 長賜輪
- Simplified Chinese: 长赐轮
Transcriptions
Standard Mandarin
- Hanyu Pinyin: Cháng Cì Lún

Ever Given (simplified Chinese: 长赐轮; traditional Chinese: 長賜輪; pinyin: Cháng Cì Lún) is one of the largest container ships in the world. The ship is owned by Shoei Kisen Kaisha (a ship-owning and leasing subsidiary of the large Japanese shipbuilding company Imabari Shipbuilding), and is time chartered and operated by container transportation and shipping company Evergreen Marine, headquartered in Luzhu, Taoyuan, Taiwan. Ever Given is registered in Panama and her technical management is the responsibility of the German ship management company Bernhard Schulte Shipmanagement.

On 23 March 2021, while traveling from Tanjung Pelepas in Malaysia to Rotterdam in the Netherlands, the ship ran aground in the Suez Canal, blocking the channel. She remained in place for six days before salvage crews freed her on 29 March 2021. The vessel was impounded by the Egyptian government on 13 April 2021 for refusing to pay a reported $916 million in fees demanded by the government, including $300 million in "loss of reputation". The compensation claim was later cut down to $600 million. In early July 2021, the ship was released by the Egyptian authorities following an agreement on compensation.

== Description ==
Ever Given is one of 13 container ships built to the Imabari 20000 design developed by Imabari Shipbuilding in Marugame, Japan, 11 of which have been chartered by Evergreen Marine as the Evergreen G-class. The ship was laid down on 25 December 2015, launched on 9 May 2018 and completed on 25 September 2018. It is Evergreen's second ship to be named Ever Given; the first one (IMO 8320901) was built in 1986 and has since been broken up.

With a length overall of 399.94 metres (1,312 ft 2 in), Ever Given is one of the longest ships in service. The hull has a beam of 58.8 metres (192 ft 11 in) and her height from keel to main deck (hull depth) is 32.9 metres (107 ft 11 in). Fully laden at design draught, Ever Given draws 14.5 metres (47 ft 7 in) of water while the scantling draught, which is used as the basis of hull strength and structural design, is 16.0 metres (52.5 ft). Ever Given has a gross tonnage of 220,940; net tonnage of 99,155; and deadweight tonnage of 199,629 tons at design draught. The ship's container capacity is 20,124 TEU.

As with most large container ships, Ever Given's propulsion system consists of a single low-speed two-stroke diesel engine coupled to a large fixed-pitch propeller. The 11-cylinder straight engine, license-manufactured Mitsui MAN B&W 11G95ME-C9, produces 59,300 kW (79,500 horsepower) at 79 rpm and gives the vessel a service speed of 22.8 knots (42.2 km/h; 26.2 mph). In addition, Ever Given has four straight-8 Yanmar 8EY33LW auxiliary diesel generators that produce electricity. For maneuvering in ports, the vessel has two 2,500 kW (3,400 hp) bow thrusters.

== Operational history ==
=== 2019 Hamburg collision ===
On 9 February 2019, the ship collided with and heavily damaged Finkenwerder, a 25-metre-long (82 ft) HADAG ferry boat which was berthed at Blankenese, near the harbour of Hamburg. Two minutes after the collision, a traffic ban on the Elbe river was mandated due to high winds.

=== 2021 Suez Canal grounding ===
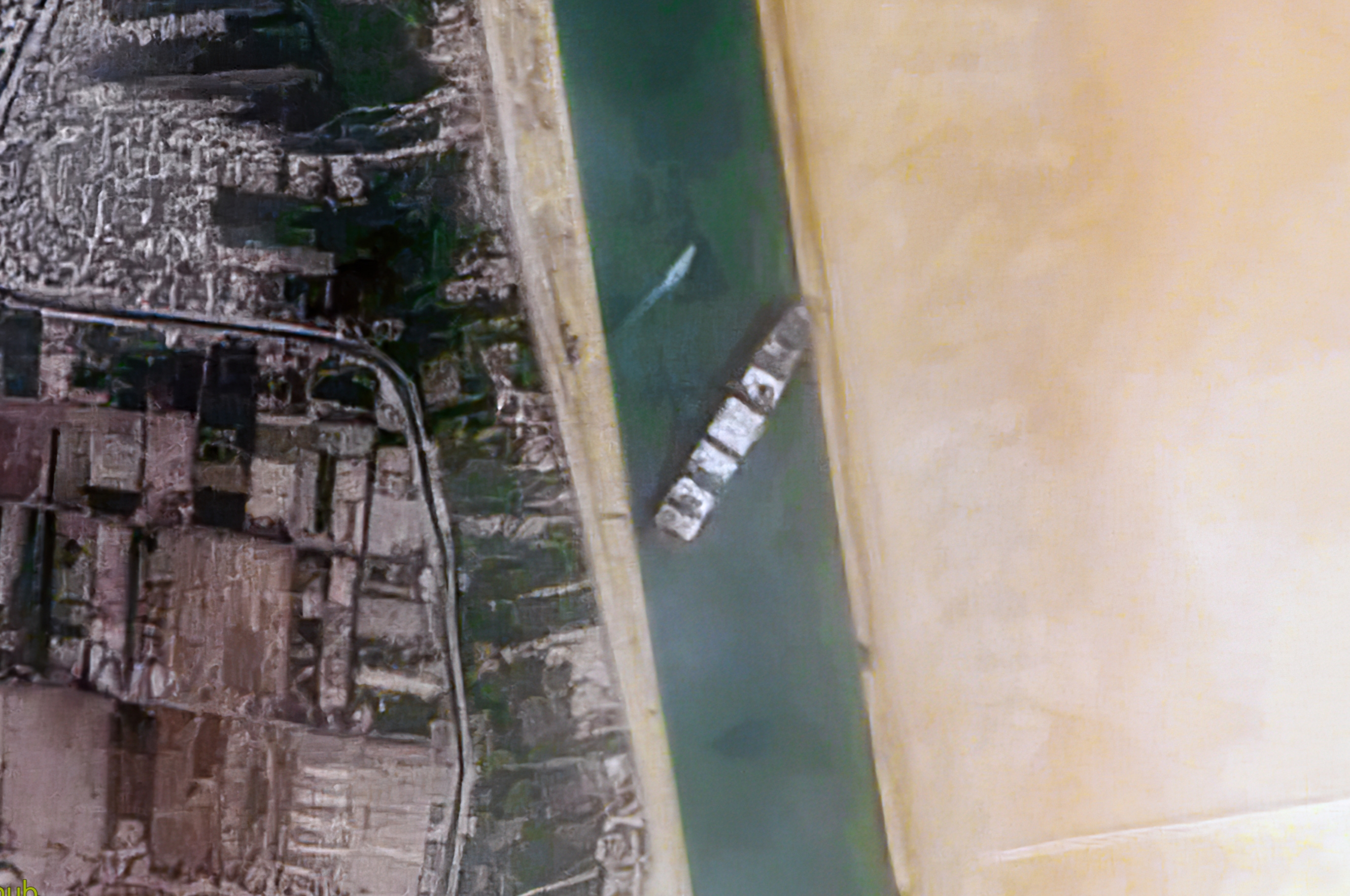
Satellite image of Ever Given blocking the Suez Canal

At 07:40 Egypt Standard Time (UTC+02:00) on 23 March 2021, as she was passing through the Suez Canal on her way to Rotterdam from Tanjung Pelepas, Ever Given became stuck (coordinates 30.01761°N 32.58018°E) near the village of Manshiyet Rugola and blocked the canal. According to a statement by the Suez Canal Authority (SCA), the ship ran aground diagonally after losing the ability to steer amid high winds and a dust storm. In a separate statement, Evergreen Marine said that it had been told the ship "was suspected of being hit by a sudden strong wind, causing the hull to deviate from [the] waterway and accidentally hit the bottom". The ship ended up with her bow wedged in one bank of the canal and stern nearly touching the other.

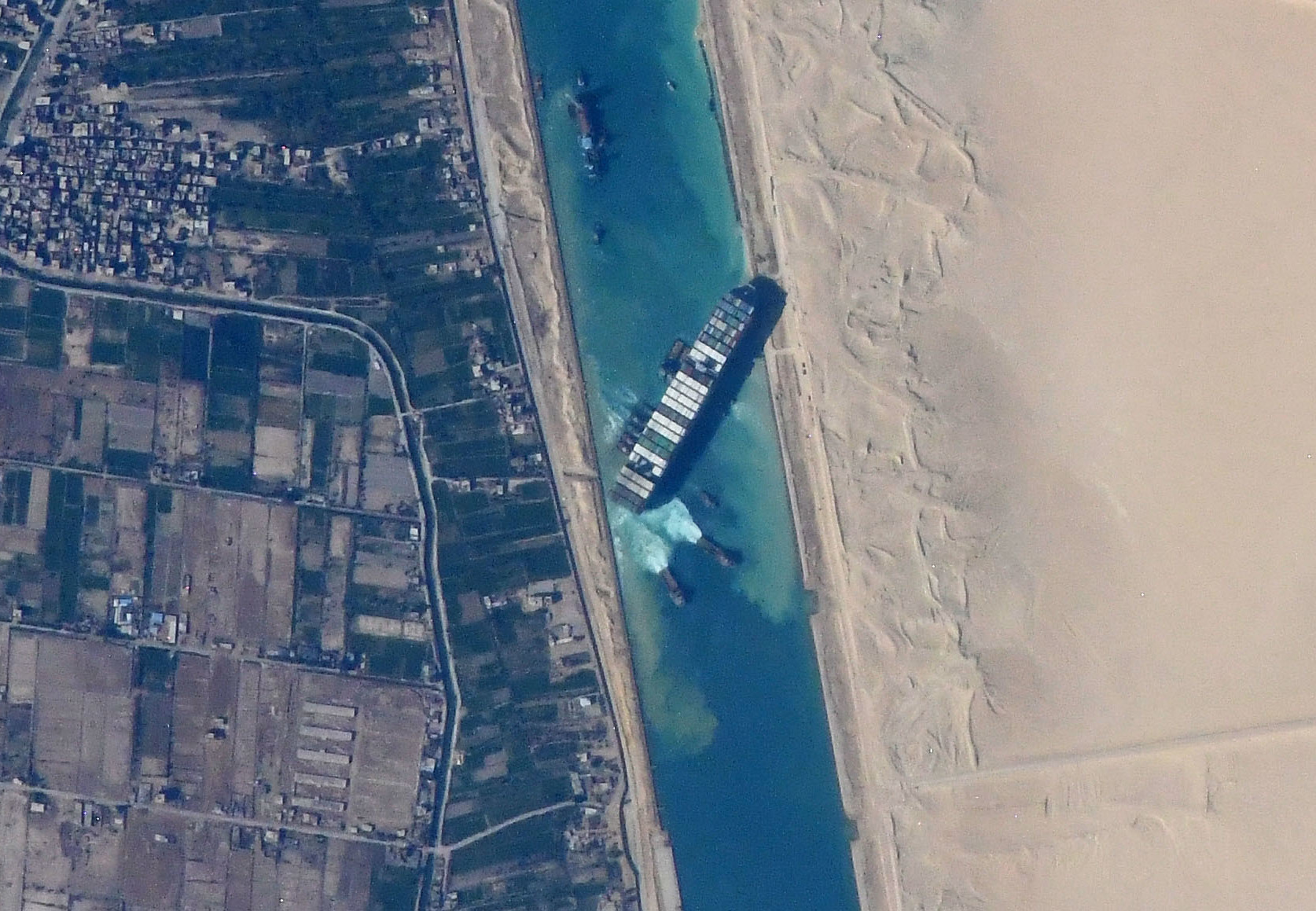
Tugboats trying to free the jammed ship, as viewed from the International Space Station, 27 March 2021

The ship, which had no tugboat, was the fifth in a northbound convoy, behind two prior container ships that were each paired with a tugboat. There were fifteen vessels behind her when she ran aground. Traffic in both directions was blocked for just over six days, leading to a traffic jam of over two hundred vessels. On 24 March, Bernhard Schulte Shipmanagement, the technical manager of the ship, denied earlier reports that she had been partially refloated. In addition, trade experts were worried about a supply chain delay, and tension due to the delay for the ships trapped as well as other vessels that planned to cross the Suez.

Eight tugboats worked to re-float the vessel in collaboration with excavators removing sand from the side of the canal where the bow of the vessel was wedged. After an overnight break, the salvage work resumed in the morning of 25 March.

Egyptian meteorologists reported that high winds and a sandstorm had affected the area on the day of the grounding, with winds gusting as much as 50 kilometres per hour (31 mph). Addressing a press conference on 27 March, Admiral Osama Rabie, chairman of the SCA, said that weather conditions were "not the main reasons" for the ship's grounding, adding, "There may have been technical or human errors ... All of these factors will become apparent in the investigation."

Aided by high spring tide, the ship was partially freed from sediment and re-floated on 29 March 2021 at 05:42 EGY (03:42 UTC), apart from the bow, which was still caught.

The ship was finally freed in the afternoon at 15:05 EGY (13:05 UTC), and the ship started moving under tow towards the Great Bitter Lake for technical inspection, the first step towards reopening the canal, planned for later that day. After the canal had been checked for damage, the SCA informed shipping agencies that shipping was to resume from 19:00 local time (17:00 UTC).

==== Aftermath ====
On 13 April, the SCA announced that the ship had been seized on court orders until the owners paid $900 million in damages. On 4 July 2021 the German newspaper Der Spiegel reported that the owners and the SCA had agreed on compensation, although the exact amount remained unclear. The settlement had been lowered to $540 million by the Suez Canal Authority. The ship departed from the Suez Canal on 7 July for scheduled deliveries of cargo at several European ports.

On 7 July 2021, Egyptian authorities released the ship after an unspecified settlement was reached. It was announced that Egypt would also receive a 75-ton tugboat from the ship's Japanese owner, Shoei Kisen Kaisha, as part of the compensation package. Ever Given sailed to Port Said. Hull inspections were carried out, with the vessel finally departing on 12 July, after a seizure delay of more than 100 days.

The ship finally arrived at her destination, the Rotterdam Maasvlakte, NL, container terminal on 29 July, after sailing for 17 days, although the trip was originally expected to take only 9.) It arrived 22 days after her release by the Egyptian government, and over four months after her grounding. It became a tourist attraction during that time. After unloading about three quarters of the load in Rotterdam, Ever Given departed on 2 August, mooring in Felixstowe Trinity Container Terminal on 3 August to complete unloading, before going out of service prior to inspection at Harwich Anchorage by Leask Marine (Orkney) on behalf of American Bureau of Shipping. It departed 6 August, for refueling at Malta Bunkering Area 3, preceded by Scot Munchen, on 15 August. During the morning of 20 August, Ever Given transited through the Suez Canal, within a 22-vessel convoy.

On 20 September 2021 the ship arrived at Qingdao Port anchorage, before berthing alongside the sufficiently large dry dock facilities for repairs on 4 October. Qingdao is also close to Chinese shipping ports where the vessel was projected to re-enter service in late October to mid-November. Photographs taken upon arrival at Qingdao Beihai Shipbuilding Heavy Industry pier indicated bow crumple damage extending as far back as the rear bow thruster tunnel. After spending nearly six weeks in dry dock there, she returned to service in November 2021, docking at Qingdao and Shanghai before continuing on her normal route. As of 2026, Ever Given is still operative.

== See also ==
- Suezmax
- Xin Hai Tong
