= Ever Fortune =

A number of ships have been named Ever Fortune, including:

- SS Ever Fortune, a cargo ship in service in 1964
- MV Ever Fortune, a container ship built in 2020
