= Evergreen Marine Corporation =

Taiwanese shipping company

Evergreen Marine Corporation (Taiwan) Ltd. 長榮海運

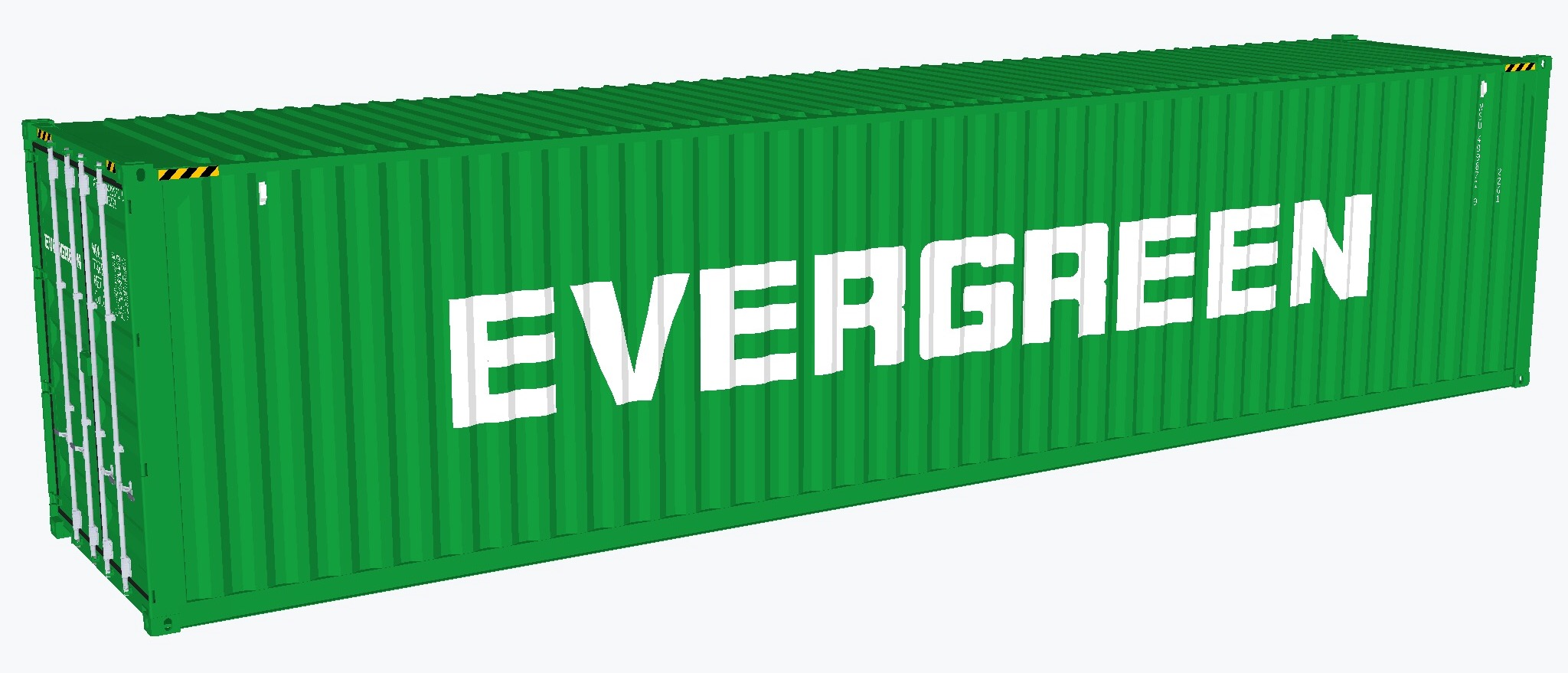
- A model of Evergreen's 40ft containers
- Type: Public
- Traded as: TWSE: 2603
- Industry: Container shipping Marine transportation
- Founded: 1968; 58 years ago
- Founder: Chang Yung-fa
- Headquarters: No. 163, Sec. 1, Xinnan Rd., Luzhu Dist., Taoyuan, Taiwan
- Area served: Worldwide
- Key people: Chang, Yen-I (Chairman) Wu Kuang-Hui (President)
- Products: Primary Business: Shipping carrier; Shipping agent; Container terminal operations; Commercial port area ship repair
- Revenue: NTD 379.07 billion (2025)
- Owner: Evergreen Group
- Number of employees: 3,110 in the Taiwan region
- Website: www.evergreen-marine.com

Evergreen Marine Corporation
- Traditional Chinese: 長榮海運
- Simplified Chinese: 长荣海运
Transcriptions
Standard Mandarin
- Hanyu Pinyin: Chángróng Hǎiyùn
Southern Min
- Tâi-lô: Tióng-îng Hái-ūn

Evergreen Marine Corporation (Taiwan) Ltd. (Chinese: 長榮海運; pinyin: Chángróng Hǎiyùn; Tâi-lô: Tióng-îng Hái-ūn) is a Taiwanese container transportation and shipping company that is headquartered in Luzhu District, Taoyuan City, Taiwan. With over 150 container ships, it is part of the Evergreen Group conglomerate of transportation firms and associated companies.

== Overview ==
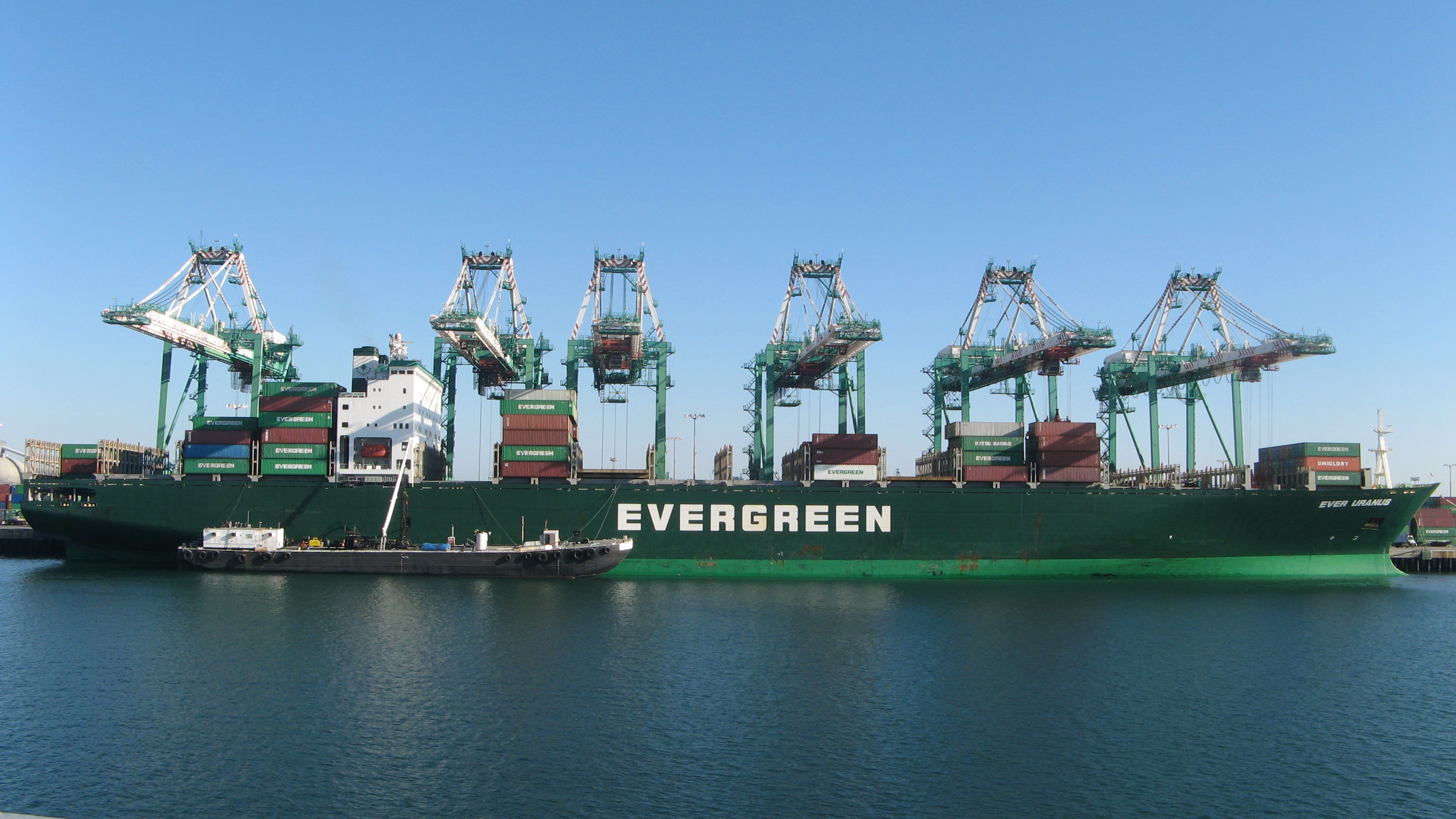
Ever Uranus at Port of Los Angeles

Evergreen calls on 240 ports worldwide in about 80 countries, and as of 2023 was the seventh-largest company in the shipping industry.

Its principal trading routes are East Asia to North America, Central America and the Caribbean; East Asia to the Mediterranean and Northern Europe; Europe to the east coast of North America; East Asia to Australia; East Asia to eastern and southern Africa; East Asia to South America; and an intra Asia service linking ports in East Asia to the Persian Gulf and the Red Sea.

The company's activities include: shipping, construction of containers and ships, management of ports, engineering and real estate development. Subsidiaries and divisions include Uniglory Marine Corp. (Taiwan), Evergreen UK Ltd. (UK), and shipping company Italia Marittima S.p.A. (Italy).

In 2007, Hatsu Marine Ltd., Italia Marittima S.p.A., Evergreen Marine Corp. and Evergreen Marine adopted the common name "Evergreen Line." Each of the four divisions were previously owned by Evergreen of Taiwan.

The majority of Evergreen's shipping containers are painted green with the word "Evergreen" placed on the sides in white letters. Uniglory containers are similarly painted and marked, but those containers are bright orange. Evergreen's refrigerated "reefer" containers have a reverse color scheme (white containers with green lettering).

== History ==
The company was founded 1 September 1968 by Yung-Fa Chang. Services began with a single cargo vessel named Central Trust, which operated a "go-anywhere" service. A second vessel was added in 1969, and used on Middle East services. Additional vessels were acquired through the 1970s, and routes to East Asia and Central America were added. Service to the U.S. began in 1974, with the establishment of Evergreen Marine Corporation (New York) Ltd.

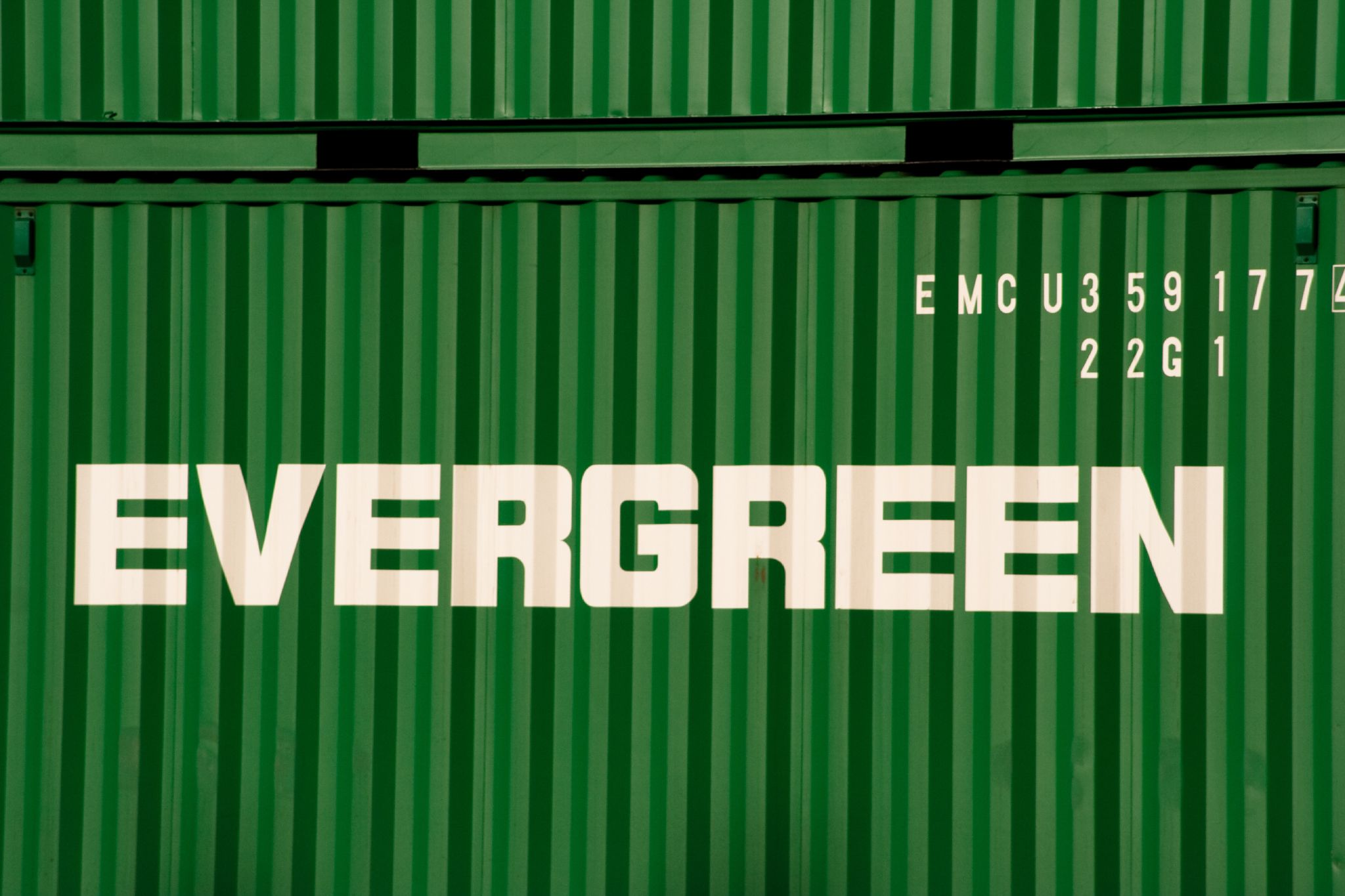
Evergreen's trademark green worldwide shipping containers.

In 1981, the parent company changed its name to Evergreen International S.A. (EIS), as the company increased its global expansion efforts. Evergreen Marine began its first circumnavigation shipping services in 1984. This service is bi-directional, covering both westbound and eastbound routings.

In 1992, almost 29,000 rubber ducks called "Friendly Floatees" were unintentionally dumped into the Pacific Ocean from a container lost overboard by the Evergreen ship Ever Laurel.

Since then, Evergreen Marine has expanded to include other shipping companies such as the Uniglory Marine Corp. (Taiwan) in 1984, the Hatsu Marine Ltd. (U.K.) in 2002, and the Italian shipping company Italia Marittima (previously Lloyd Triestino, and founded as "Österreichischer Lloyd" in 1835) in 1993. Uniglory was made a division of the company in 1999. Evergreen Marine is partnered with EVA Airways, founded in 1989, and Uni Air, founded in 1998.

In 2002, Evergreen Marine operated 61 container vessels, with a total fleet size totaling 130 vessels with 400,000 TEU (twenty-foot equivalent units). By 2008, Evergreen Marine operated 178 container vessels. In 2009, the company announced plans to build 100 additional vessels, in anticipation of a global economic recovery by 2012.

== Accidents and incidents ==
=== Ever Laurel ===
In 1992, nearly 30,000 Friendly Floatee bath toys en route to Tacoma, Washington were spilled into the Pacific Ocean.

=== Ever Summit ===
In January 2019, the Ever Summit crashed into a crane. There were no deaths or injuries.

=== Ever Given ===
On 23 March 2021, the container ship Ever Given became stuck in the Suez Canal, leading to a significant impediment in marine shipping world-wide. After nearly a week, tugboats and heavy machinery managed to re-float and free the ship.

=== Ever Forward ===
On 13 March 2022, the container ship Ever Forward ran aground in the Chesapeake Bay, near Baltimore, Maryland, U.S. The ship left the dredged navigation channel and became stuck. On 31 March 2022, Evergreen declared general average after two attempts to refloat the vessel had failed. Containers were removed from the ship to lighten the load, and dredging was also underway to allow the ship to be freed. On the morning of 17 April, coinciding with the rising tide, the vessel was finally refloated.

=== Ever Lunar ===
On 1 August 2025, the container ship Ever Lunar reportedly lost approximately 50 containers near Port of Callao. Local authorities had previously closed all ports along the coast due to a tsunami warning.

== Operations ==
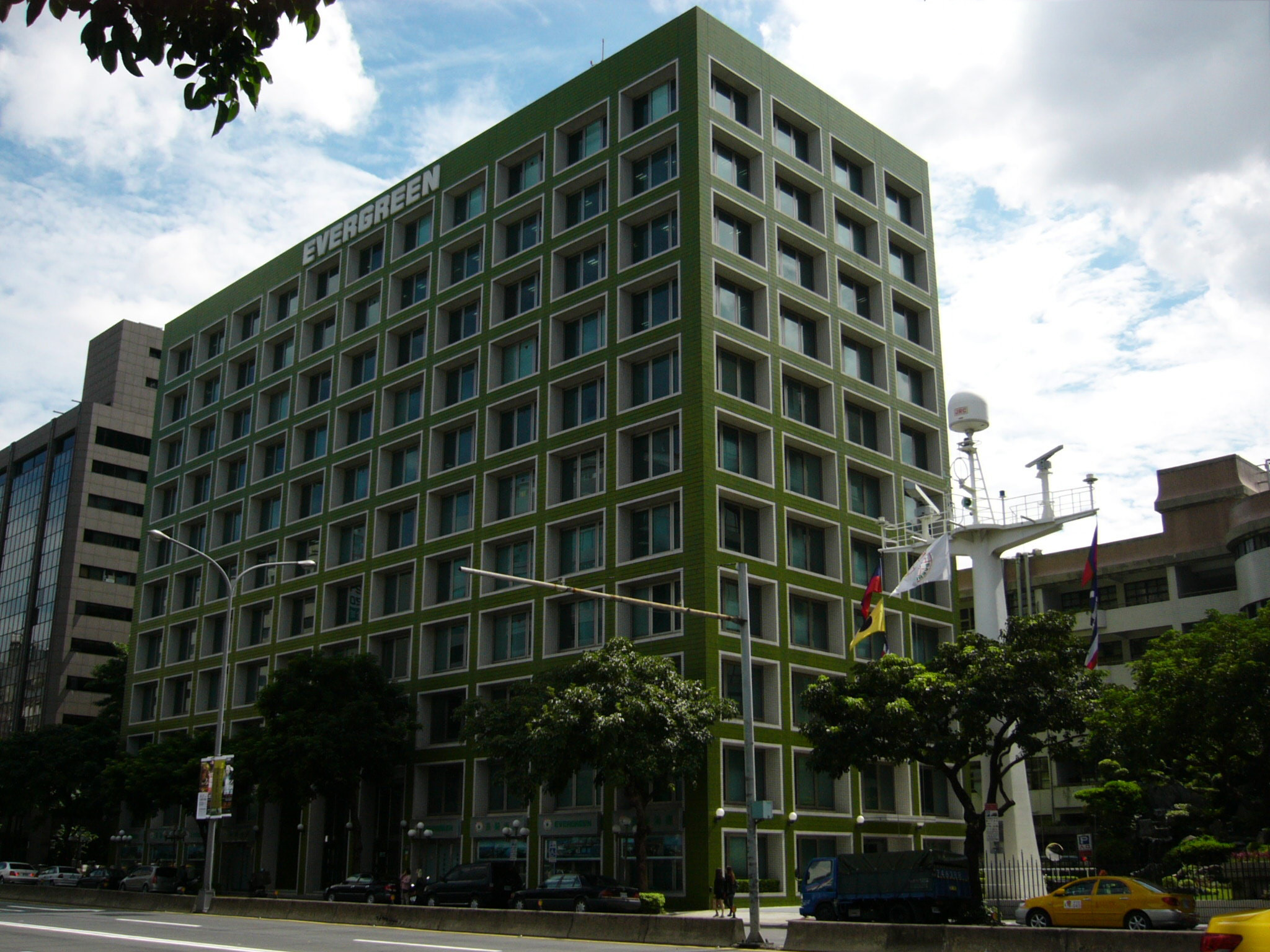
Evergreen Marine Building on Minsheng East Road Sec. 2, Taipei, Taiwan.

Evergreen Marine's operations primarily center around five general routings:

- East Asia to North America/Central America
- East Asia to Northern Europe/Mediterranean
- Europe to North America (transatlantic)
- East Asia to Southern Hemisphere (intercontinental)
- Intra-Asia

The shipping line's busiest routings are in the first category, East Asia to North America and Central America. Within this area, common traffic is between Taiwan, Japan, Korea, and China with the U.S. West Coast, along with routings to the East Caribbean via Panama.

== Terminals ==
Evergreen Marine operates four major transshipment hubs, and multiple container terminals.

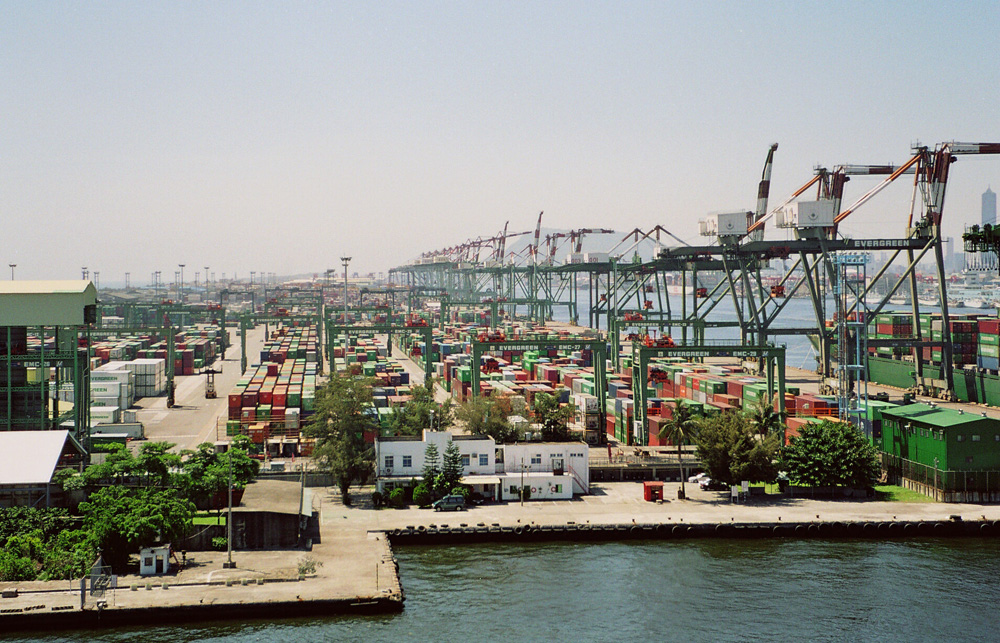
Evergreen Kaohsiung Container Terminal, Taiwan

=== Transshipment hubs ===
- Taichung Container Terminal, Taiwan
- Kaohsiung Container Terminal, Taiwan
- Colon Container Terminal, Panama

=== Terminals ===
- Evergreen terminals in Asia, (e.g. Thailand), Europe (e.g. Italy), and elsewhere
- Evergreen terminals in Middle East, North Yard Company

== Subsidiaries and divisions ==
=== Maritime lines ===
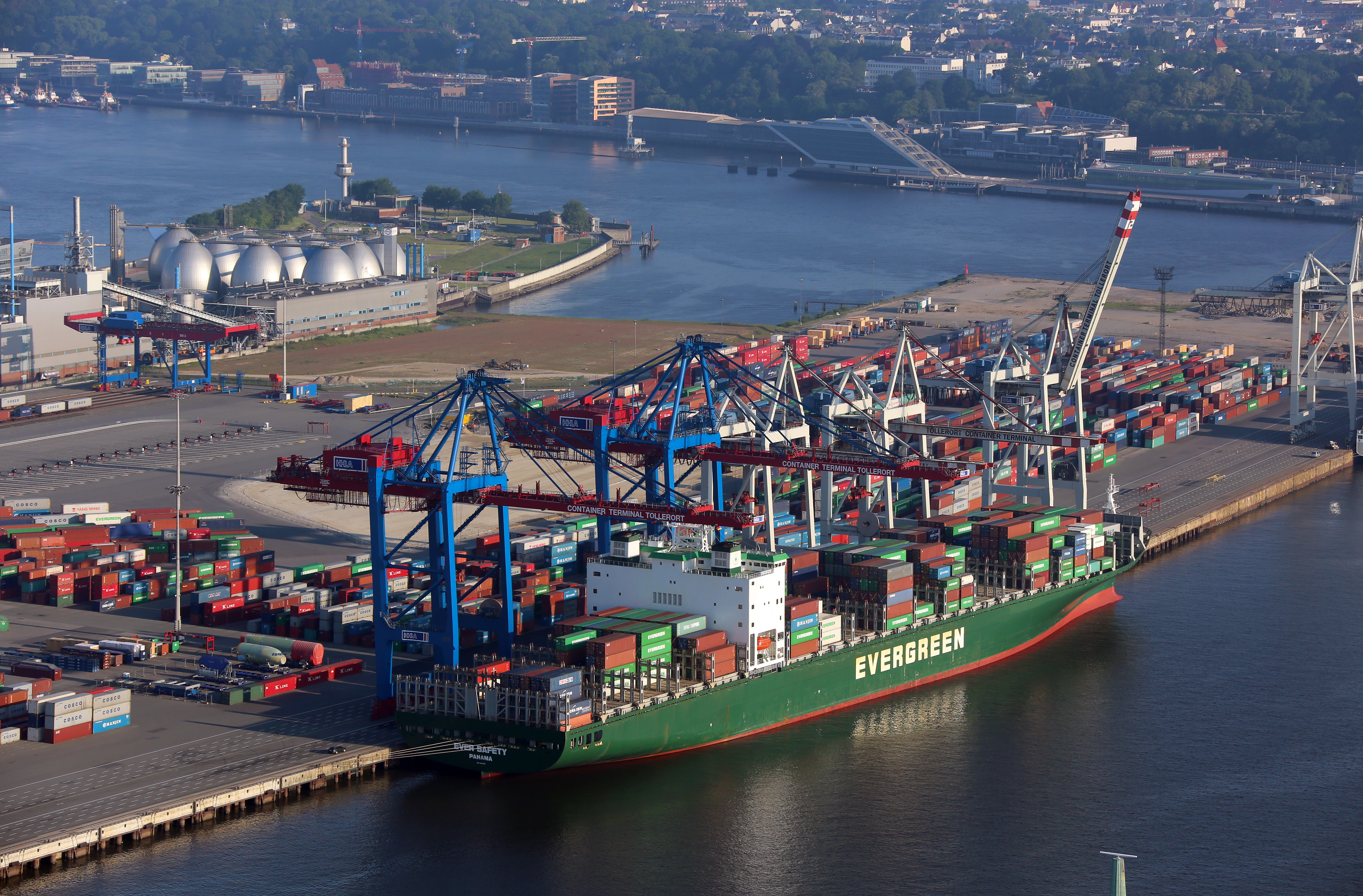
The Ever Safety in Hamburg, June 2013

Since 2007, the following have been merged into the single Evergreen Line:

- Uniglory Marine Corp. (Taiwan)
- Evergreen UK Ltd. (UK)
- Italia Marittima S.p.A. (Italy)

=== Service network ===
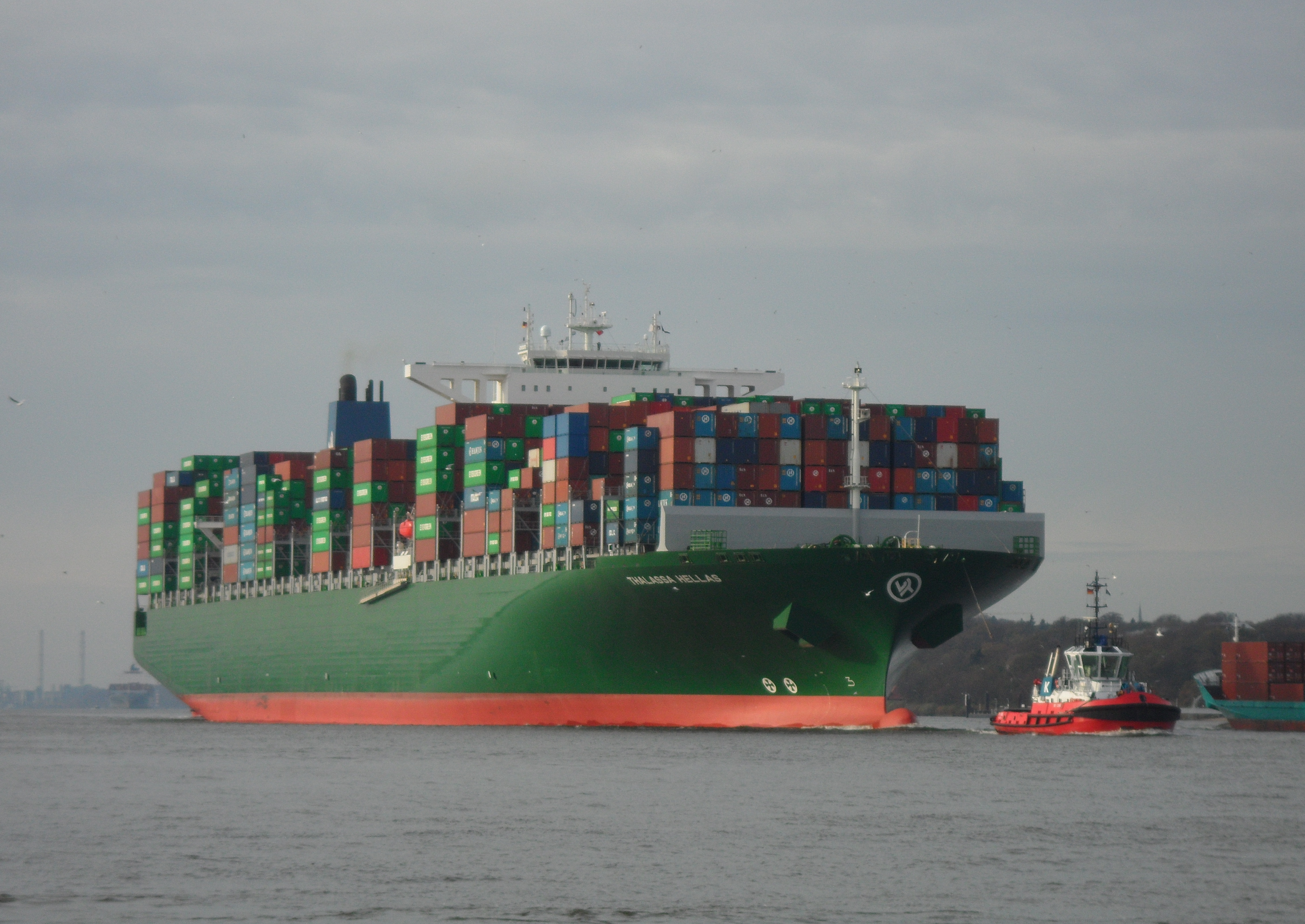
The Thalassa Hellas on its maiden voyage

Evergreen Marine's worldwide service network is handled through the following agencies:

- Evergreen Marine Corp. (Taiwan) Ltd.
- Evergreen Korea Corp.
- Evergreen Marine Corp. (Malaysia) Sdn Bhd.
- Evergreen Shipping(Singapore) Pte Ltd.
- Evergreen Shipping Agency (Thailand) Co. Ltd.
- P.T. Evergreen Shipping Agency Indonesia ee'
- Evergreen Vietnam Corp.
- Evergreen Japan Corp.
- Evergreen Marine (Hong Kong) Ltd.
- Evergreen Philippines Corp.
- Evergreen India Private Ltd.
- Evergreen International S.A. / Unigreen Marine S.A.
- Evergreen Shipping Agency (America) Corp.
- Evergreen Shipping Agency (Russia) Ltd.
- Evergreen Marine Australia Pty Ltd.
- Evergreen Shipping Spain
- Evergreen France S.A.
- Evergreen Shipping Agency (Netherlands) B.V.
- Evergreen Deutschland GmbH
- Evergreen Shipping Agency (Poland) Sp. Z o.o.
- Evergreen Gesellschaft M.B.H.
- Evergreen Marine (UK) Ltd.
- Evergreen Agency (Ireland) Ltd.
- Evergreen Shipping Agency (Italy) S.p.A.
- Green Andes (Chile)
- Global Shipping Agencies (Colombia)
- Baridhi Shipping Lines Ltd (Bangladesh)

== Fleet ==
Evergreen Marine (including Uniglory, Lloyd Triestino & Hatsu) operated 153 container ships with 439,538 twenty-foot equivalent units (TEU) on 1 May 2005. In total, Evergreen Marine operated 178 container ships in 2008.

Evergreen container ship classes since 1975
Ship class	Built	Capacity (TEU)	Ships in class	Notes
Ever Spring-class	1975–1976	646	4	
Ever Valor-class	1977–1979	1214	7	
Ever Level-class	1979–1980, 1983	1800	6	
Ever G-class	1983	2240	3	two branches of G-glass
Ever G-class	1984–1985	2728	17	
Ever GL/GX-class	1986–1988	3428	11	
Ever Racer-class	1993–1995	4229	10	
Ever Dainty-class	1996–1998	4163	10	
Ever A-class	1996–1999	1162	14	
Ever Ultra-class	1996–2001	5364	18	
Ever P-class	1999–2003	1618	16	
Ever E-class	2001–2002	6336	5	
LT Cortesia-class	2005–2006	8100	8	Long-term charter from Conti Reederei
Ever S-class	2005–2008	7024	10	
Ever L-class	2012–2015	8452–9532	30	
Thalassa Hellas-class	2013–2014	13,808	10	9 ships under Long-term charter from Enesel; 1 ship under Evergreen Marine
Triton-class	2016	14,424	5	Long-term charter from Costamare
Tampa Triumph-class	2017	13,656	5	Long-term charter from Costamare
Ever B-class	2017–2019	2,867–2,881	20	
Ever G-class	2018–2019	20,124–20,160	11	Long-term charter from Shoei Kisen Kaisha
Ever F-class	2020–2022	11,850–12,188	20	Long-term charter from Shoei Kisen Kaisha
Ever C-class	2020–2021	1,900	25	Long-term charter from Nissen Kaiun.
Ever O-class	2020–2021	2,634	14	
Ever A-class	2021–onwards	23,888–23,992	14	6 to be built by Samsung Heavy Industries and 8 by China State Shipbuilding Corporation; Ever Ace was the world’s largest container ship when it was delivered in July 2021.
Ever M-class	2023–2025	15,000	20	To be built by Samsung Heavy Industries.
Ever C-class	2024–2025	1,800	2	To be built by CSSC Huangpu Wenchong Shipbuilding.
Ever W-class	2024–2025	2,300	11	To be built by CSSC Huangpu Wenchong Shipbuilding.
Ever V-class	2024–2025	3,000	11	To be built by CSSC Huangpu Wenchong Shipbuilding.
TBD	2026–2027	16,000	24	To be built by Samsung Heavy Industries and Nihon Shipyard Co.
TBD	2026	2,400	6	To be built by CSSC Huangpu Wenchong Shipbuilding.
TBD	2027–2028	24,000	11	To be built by Hanwha Ocean and Guangzhou Shipyard International.
TBD	2028–2030	14,000	14	To be built by Samsung Heavy Industries and Guangzhou Shipyard International.
TBD	2028–2030	3,100	16	To be built by CSSC Huangpu Wenchong Shipbuilding.
TBD	2028–2030	5,900	7	To be built by Jiangsu New Yangzi Shipbuilding.

The following are vessels transferred between Evergreen Marine and Uniglory Marine (Taiwanese or Panamanian flag) and subsidiaries:

- Lloyd Triestino / Italy (ship name begins with pre-fix "LT", since 2006 with "Ital
- Evergreen UK Ltd. / UK (ship name begins with pre-fix "Ever"): Hatsu Marine was renamed Evergreen UK (previously, Evergreen UK ships, as Hatsu ships, were prefixed with the word "Hatsu", for example, the Hatsu Sigma is now known as the Ever Sigma.)
- Some vessels delivered as new buildings to these subsidiaries.

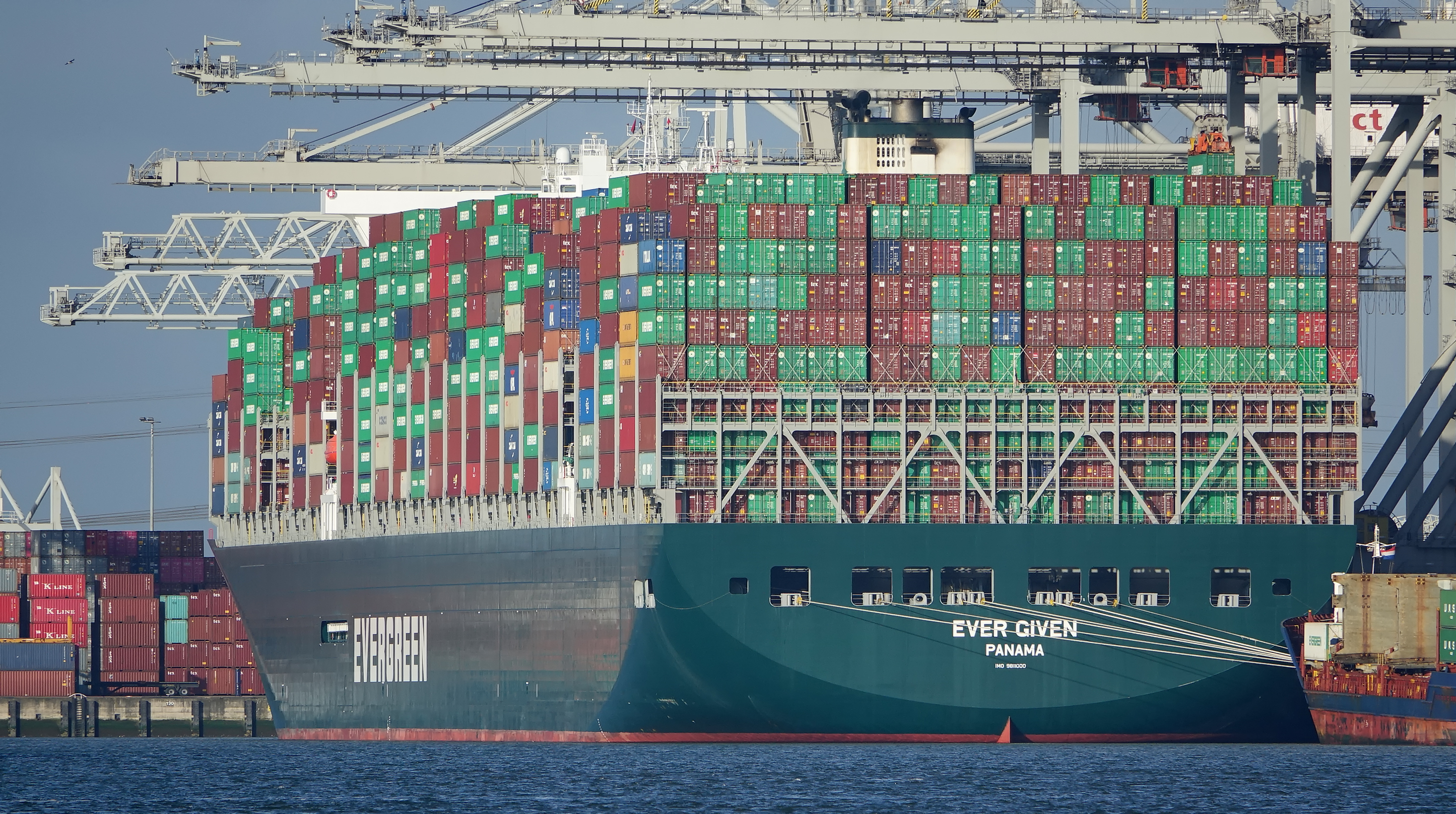
Ever Given in the port of Rotterdam 2020.

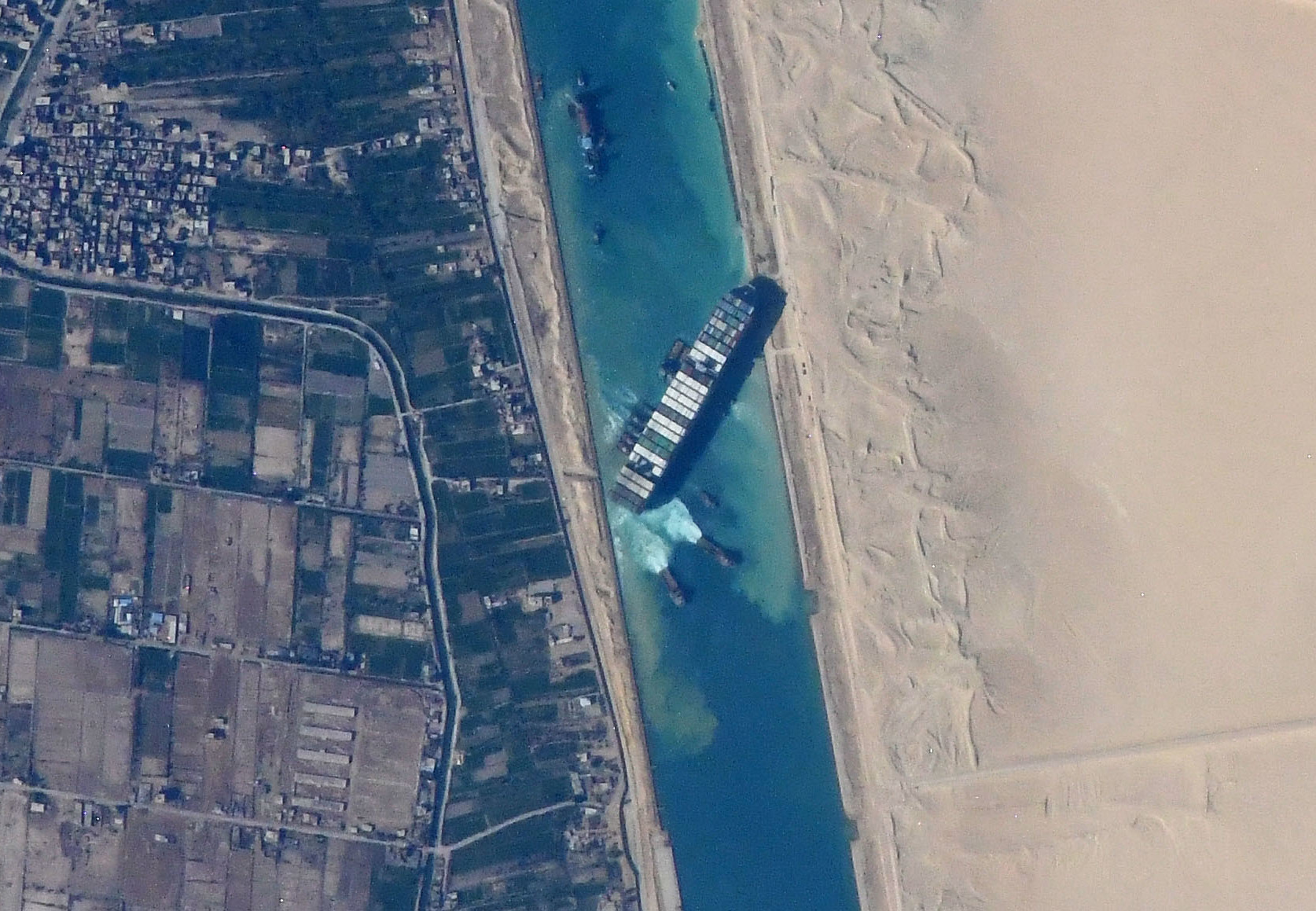
Ever Given obstructing the Suez Canal, March 2021

== See also ==
- Chang Yung-fa
- Ever Given
- Evergreen Group
- Italia Marittima
- List of companies of Taiwan
- List of largest container shipping companies
- Evergreen Maritime Museum
- EVA Air
- Maritime industries of Taiwan
- Transportation in Taiwan
- 2021 Suez Canal obstruction
