= Evergreen B-class container ship =

Container ship class

Class overview
- Builders: CSBC Corporation; Imabari Shipbuilding
- Operators: Evergreen Marine
- In service: 2017–present
- Planned: 20
- Completed: 20
- Active: 20

General characteristics (CSBC)
- Type: Container ship
- Tonnage: 33,266 GT
- Length: 211.9 m (695 ft)
- Beam: 32.8 m (108 ft)
- Draft: 11.2 m (37 ft)
- Capacity: 2,881 TEU

General characteristics (Imabari)
- Type: Container ship
- Tonnage: 32,691 GT
- Length: 211 m (692 ft)
- Beam: 32.8 m (108 ft)
- Draft: 11.2 m (37 ft)
- Capacity: 2,867 TEU

The Evergreen B class is a series of 20 container ships built for Evergreen Marine. The ships were built by CSBC Corporation in Taiwan and Imabari Shipbuilding in Japan. The ships have a maximum theoretical capacity of around 2,800 twenty-foot equivalent units (TEU).

== List of ships ==
Ship	Yard number	IMO number	Delivered	Status	Ref.	Flag	Owner
CSBC Corporation
Ever Bliss	1065	9786932	3 September 2017	In service		Panama	GreenCompass Marine S.A.
Ever Balmy	1066	9786944	26 October 2017	In service		Taiwan	Evergreen Marine Corp. (Taiwan) Ltd.
Ever Birth	1067	9786956	29 December 2017	In service		Panama	GreenCompass Marine S.A.
Ever Basis	1068	9786968	2 March 2018	In service		Taiwan	Evergreen Marine Corp. (Taiwan) Ltd.
Ever Bonny	1069	9786970	23 March 2018	In service		Panama	GreenCompass Marine S.A.
Ever Beady	1070	9786982	23 April 2018	In service		Taiwan	Evergreen Marine Corp. (Taiwan) Ltd.
Ever Bonus	1071	9786994	15 May 2018	In service		Panama	GreenCompass Marine S.A.
Ever Beamy	1072	9787003	8 June 2018	In service		Taiwan	Evergreen Marine Corp. (Taiwan) Ltd.
Ever Boomy	1073	9787015	6 July 2018	In service		Panama	GreenCompass Marine S.A.
Ever Bloom	1074	9787027	27 July 2018	In service		Taiwan	Evergreen Marine Corp. (Taiwan) Ltd.
Imabari Shipbuilding
Ever Brace	S-951	9784116	11 May 2018	In service		Panama	GreenCompass Marine S.A.
Ever Befit	S-952	9784128	28 June 2018	In service		Taiwan	Evergreen Marine Corp. (Taiwan) Ltd.
Ever Brave	S-953	9784130	30 August 2018	In service		Panama	GreenCompass Marine S.A.
Ever Being	S-954	9784142	12 October 2018	In service		Taiwan	Evergreen Marine Corp. (Taiwan) Ltd.
Ever Breed	S-955	9784154	28 November 2018	In service		Panama	GreenCompass Marine S.A.
Ever Board	S-956	9790050	27 December 2018	In service		Taiwan	Evergreen Marine Corp. (Taiwan) Ltd.
Ever Build	S-957	9790062	24 April 2019	In service		Panama	GreenCompass Marine S.A.
Ever Bless	S-958	9790074	21 June 2019	In service		Taiwan	Evergreen Marine Corp. (Taiwan) Ltd.
Ever Burly	S-959	9790086	23 August 2019	In service		Panama	GreenCompass Marine S.A.
Ever Blink	S-960	9790098	20 September 2019	In service		Taiwan	Evergreen Marine Corp. (Taiwan) Ltd.

The ship flag of odd numbered ships is Panama. The owner is GreenCompass Marine S.A. The ship flag of even numbered ships is Taiwan. The owner is Evergreen Marine Corp. (Taiwan) Ltd.
