= Evergreen E-class container ship =

Container ship class

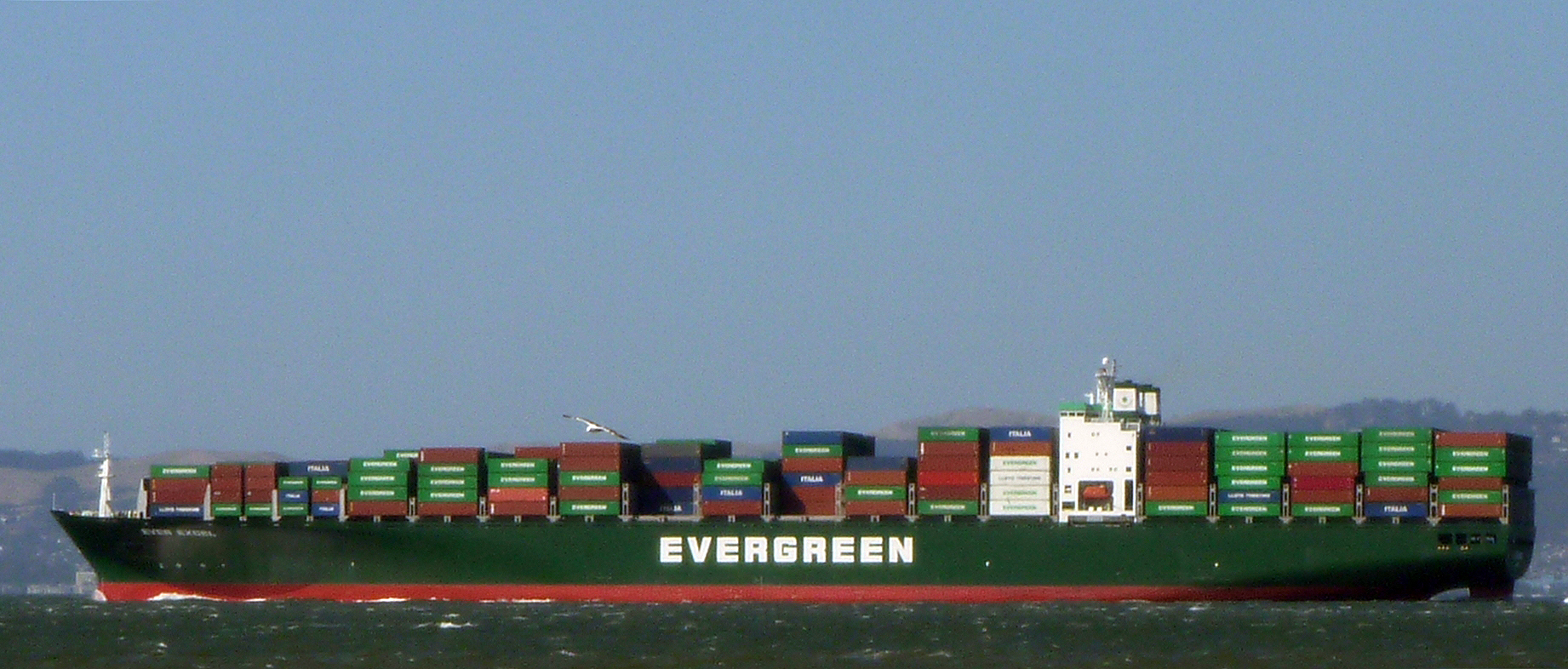

Class overview
- Builders: Mitsubishi Heavy Industries
- Operators: Evergreen Marine
- In service: 2002–present
- Planned: 5
- Completed: 5
- Active: 5

General characteristics
- Type: Container ship
- Tonnage: 76,067 GT
- Length: 299.99 m (984.2 ft)
- Beam: 42.8 m (140 ft)
- Draft: 13.5 m (44 ft)
- Capacity: 6,332 TEU

The Evergreen E class is a series of five container ships built for Evergreen Marine. The ships were built by Mitsubishi Heavy Industries at their Kobe shipyard in Japan. The ships have a maximum theoretical capacity of around 6,332 twenty-foot equivalent units (TEU).

== List of ships ==
Ship name	Previous names	Yard number	IMO number	Delivered	Status	Ref.
Ever Eagle	Hatsu Eagle (2001–2008)	1251	9241310	30 October 2001	In service	
Ever Envoy	Hatsu Envoy (2002–2010)	1252	9241308	12 March 2002	In service	
Ever Excel	Hatsu Excel (2002–2010)	1253	9241322	6 June 2002	In service	
Ever Elite	Hatsu Elite (2002–2007)	1254	9241281	15 October 2002	In service	
Ever Ethic	Hatsu Ethic (2003–2008)	1255	9241293	12 March 2002	In service	
