= Evergreen G-class container ship =

Series of container ships

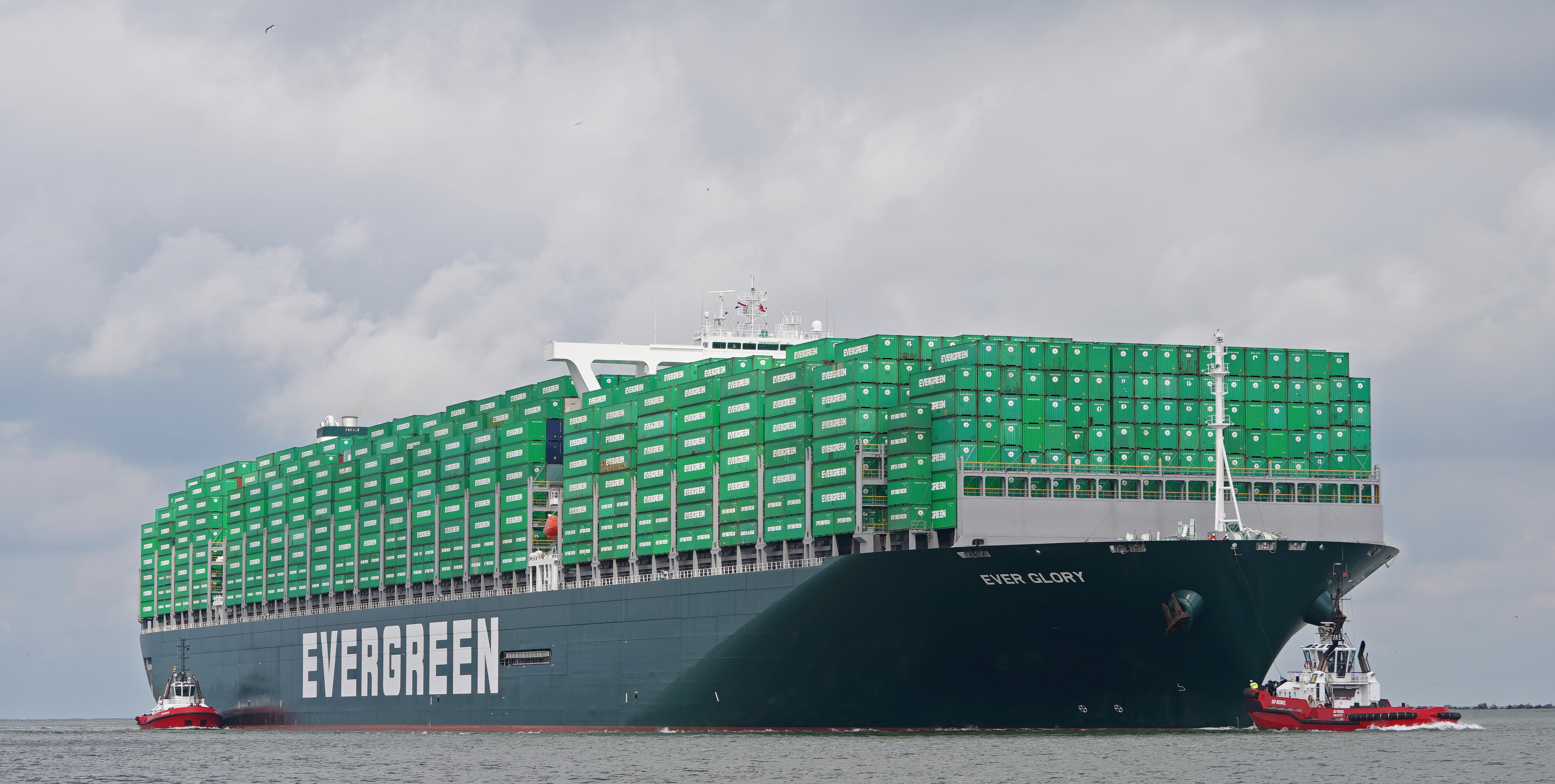
- Ever Glory in the Port of Rotterdam on 14 June 2019

Class overview
- Builders: Imabari Shipbuilding
- Operators: Evergreen Marine
- In service: 2018–present
- Planned: 11
- Completed: 11
- Active: 11

General characteristics
- Type: Container ship
- Tonnage: 217,612 GT to 219,688 GT
- Length: 400 m (1,312 ft 4 in)
- Beam: 58.8 m (192 ft 11 in)
- Draft: 16 m (52 ft 6 in)
- Propulsion: Mitsui–MAN B&W 11G95ME-C9; 59,300 kW (79,523 hp)
- Capacity: 20,124 TEU to 20,160 TEU

The Evergreen G class is a series of 11 container ships built for Evergreen Marine by Imabari Shipbuilding in Japan. The maximum theoretical capacity of these ships is in the range of 20,124 to 20,388 standard shipping containers (twenty-foot equivalent unit TEU).

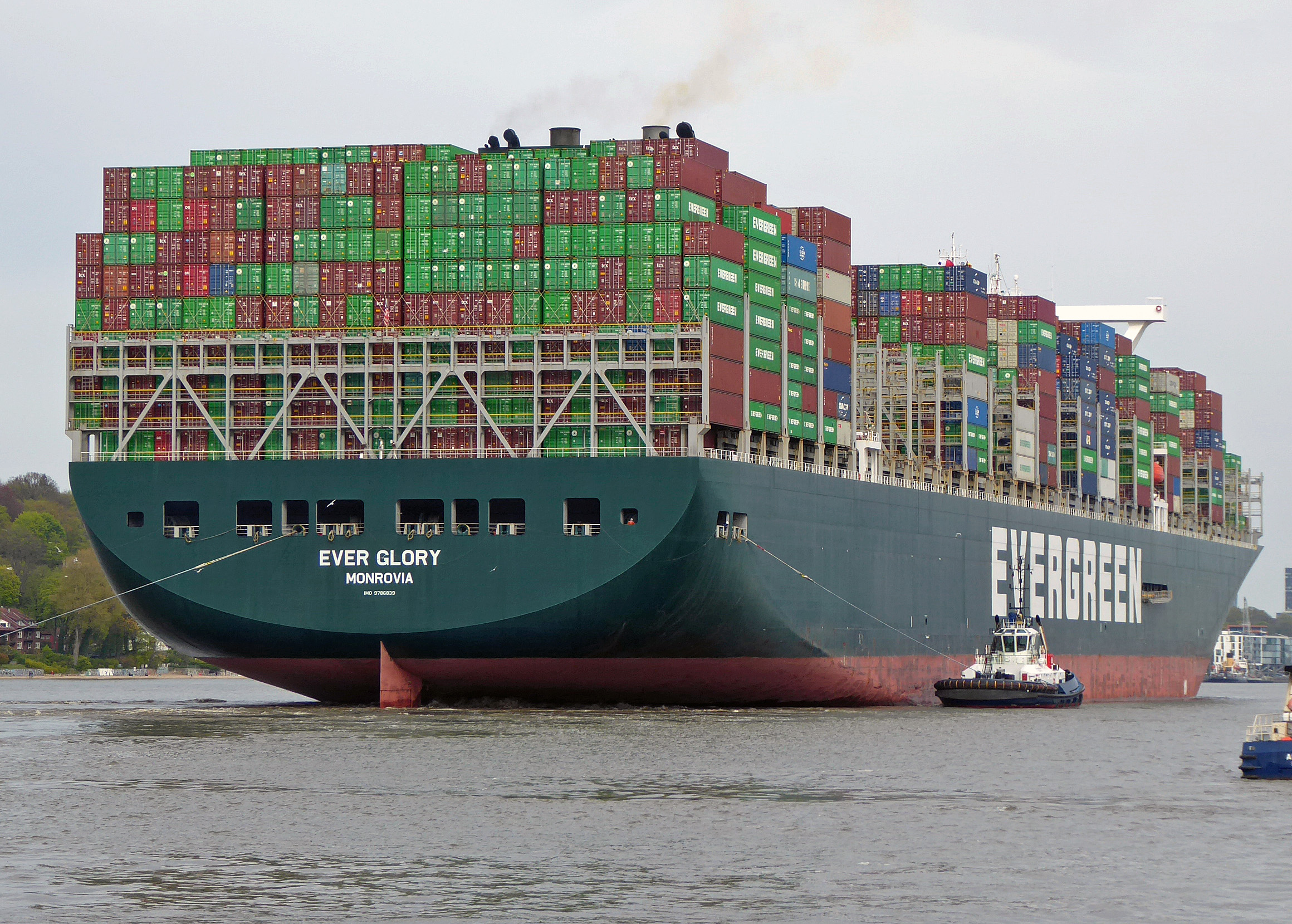
Stern view of Ever Glory in Hamburg, 2022

== History ==
The ships constitute 11 out of 13 container ships built to the Imabari 20000 TEU containership design developed by Imabari Shipbuilding. Evergreen time charters all 11 ships from their owner, Shoei Kisen Kaisha, which is a leasing subsidiary of Imabari Shipbuilding. On 30 March 2018, the first ship the Ever Golden was delivered with a capacity of 20,338 TEU.

In 2019, Evergreen announced it would be putting scrubbers on many of their ships in order to lower polluting emissions. Ever Glory and all newer ships were built with scrubbers already installed. These scrubbers take up a considerable amount of space and the resulting capacity of these ships is slightly reduced to 20,160 TEU. The previous ships that did not have scrubbers when they were built had them retrofitted. This has reduced their capacity to 20,124 TEU.

== Accidents and incidents ==
On 9 February 2019, the Ever Given collided with the ferry Finkenwerder, which was docked at a wharf in Hamburg on the river Elbe at the time. The Finkenwerder was heavily damaged.

In March 2021, the Ever Given ran aground and blocked the Suez Canal for six days. The ship was freed but then held in the Great Bitter Lake over a declared 900 million dollar compensation claim by the Suez Canal Authority, which they settled with owner Shoei Kisen Kaisha for $540 million in early July.

== List of ships ==
Ship name	Yard number	IMO number	Delivered	Status	Notes	Ref.	Flag	Owner	Charterer
Imabari Shipbuilding Saijo shipyard
Ever Golden	8191	9811012	30 March 2018	In service	Retrofitted with scrubbers		Panama	Shoei Kisen Kaisha	GreenCompass Marine S.A.
Ever Genius	8192	9786815	2 August 2018	In service	Retrofitted with scrubbers		Panama	Shoei Kisen Kaisha	GreenCompass Marine S.A.
Ever Gifted	8182	9786827	13 December 2018	In service	Retrofitted with scrubbers		Singapore	Shoei Kisen Kaisha	Evergreen Asia (Singapore) Pte Ltd.
Ever Glory	8193	9786839	9 May 2019	In service	Built with scrubbers		Liberia	Shoei Kisen Kaisha	Evergreen Marine (Hong Kong) Ltd.
Ever Globe	8194	9786841	10 September 2019	In service	Built with scrubbers		Panama	Shoei Kisen Kaisha	GreenCompass Marine S.A.
Imabari Shipbuilding Marugame shipyard
Ever Goods	1876	9810991	5 June 2018	In service	Retrofitted with scrubbers		Panama	Shoei Kisen Kaisha	GreenCompass Marine S.A.
Ever Given	1833	9811000	25 September 2018	In service	Retrofitted with scrubbers		Panama	Shoei Kisen Kaisha	GreenCompass Marine S.A.
Ever Grade	1834	9820855	15 January 2019	In service	Retrofitted with scrubbers		Panama	Shoei Kisen Kaisha	GreenCompass Marine S.A.
Ever Gentle	1877	9820922	16 March 2019	In service	Retrofitted with scrubbers		Liberia	Shoei Kisen Kaisha	Evergreen Marine (Hong Kong) Ltd.
Ever Govern	1878	9832717	9 July 2019	In service	Built with scrubbers		Panama	Shoei Kisen Kaisha	GreenCompass Marine S.A.
Ever Greet	1835	9832729	15 October 2019	In service	Built with scrubbers		Panama	Shoei Kisen Kaisha	GreenCompass Marine S.A.

== See also ==
- Evergreen A-class container ship
- Triton-class container ship
- Thalassa Hellas-class container ship
- Tampa Triumph-class container ship
