= Evergreen L-class container ship =

Container ship class

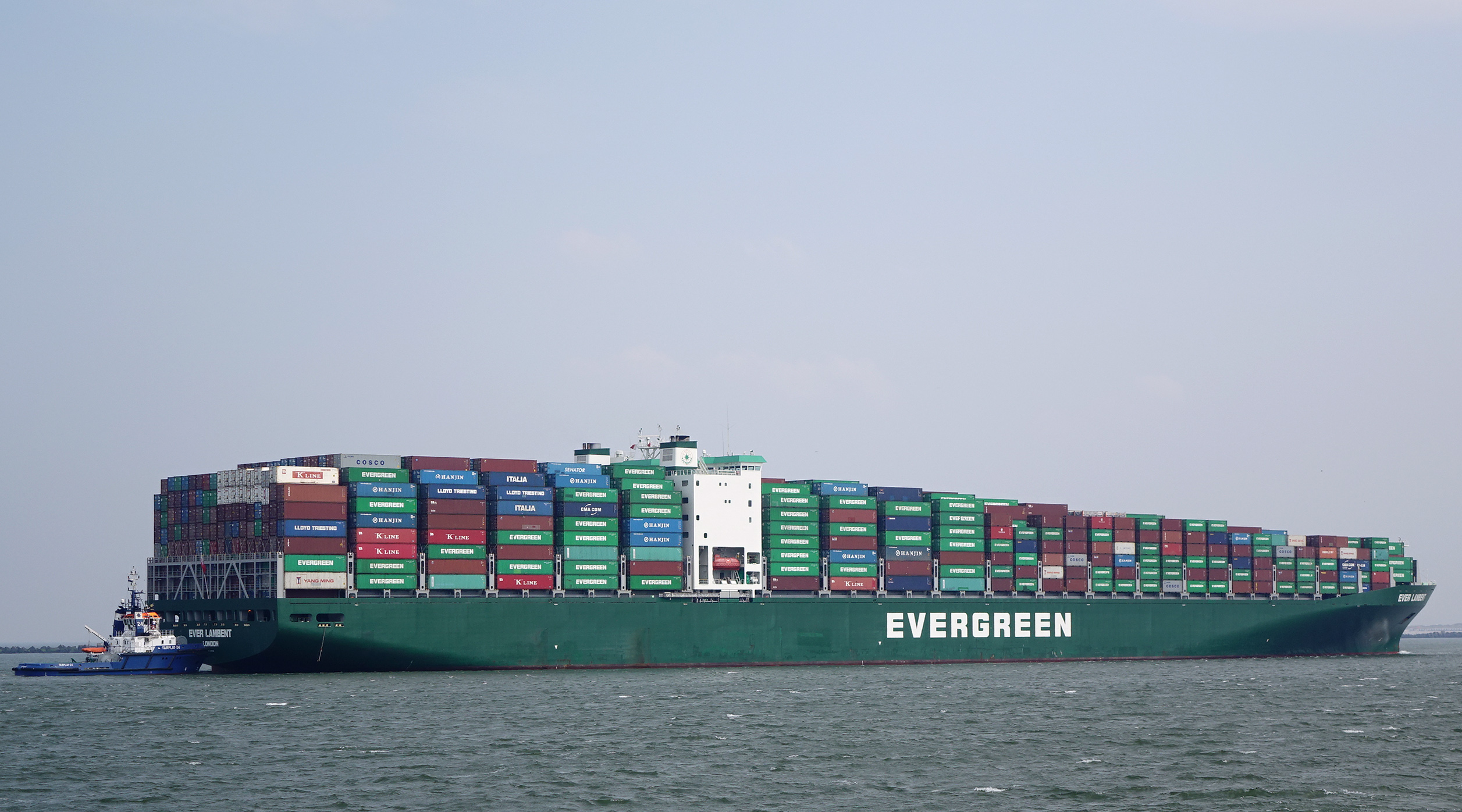
- Ever Lambent entering the Port of Rotterdam

Class overview
- Builders: Samsung Heavy Industries, CSBC Corporation
- Operators: Evergreen Marine
- In service: 2012–present
- Planned: 30
- Completed: 30
- Active: 30

General characteristics (SHI)
- Type: Container ship
- Tonnage: 98,830 GT to 99,995 GT
- Length: 335 m (1,099 ft)
- Beam: 45.8 m (150 ft)
- Draft: 14.2 m (47 ft)
- Capacity: 8,452 TEU (original); 9,466 TEU (upgraded)

General characteristics (CSBC)
- Type: Container ship
- Tonnage: 99,946 GT to 101,063 GT
- Length: 334.8 m (1,098 ft)
- Beam: 45.8 m (150 ft)
- Draft: 14.2 m (47 ft)
- Capacity: 8,508 TEU (original); 9,532 TEU (upgraded)

The Evergreen L class is a series of 30 container ships built for Evergreen Marine. The ships were built by Samsung Heavy Industries in Korea and CSBC Corporation in Taiwan. These ships have a maximum theoretical capacity of around 8,500 to 9,500 twenty-foot equivalent units (TEU).

Some of the ships have been upgraded, starting in 2019 with the Ever Laden. Major changes include the addition of an exhaust scrubber system and the raising of the deck house and lashing bridges. This allows containers to be stacked higher on deck, which increases the maximum number of containers which the ships can carry by about 1,000 TEU. The work was carried out at the Huarun Dadong Dockyard in China.

== List of ships ==
Ship name	Yard number	IMO number	Delivered	Status	Notes	Ref.	Flag	Owner
Samsung Heavy Industries
Ever Lambent	1980	9595436	25 July 2012	In service	Upgraded		United Kingdom	Yamasa New Pulsar V S.A
Ever Laden	1981	9595448	27 August 2012	In service	Upgraded		Panama	Yamasa New Pulsar V S.A
Ever Lasting	1982	9595450	31 August 2012	In service	Upgraded		United Kingdom	Yamasa New Pulsar V S.A
Ever Leading	1983	9595462	11 September 2012	In service	Upgraded		United Kingdom	Yamasa New Pulsar V S.A
Ever Laurel	1984	9595474	24 September 2012	In service			Singapore	Evergreen Marine (Singapore) Pte Ltd.
Ever Libra	1985	9595486	22 October 2012	In service	Upgraded		Taiwan	Evergreen Marine Corp. (Taiwan)
Ever Lawful	1986	9595498	20 November 2012	In service	Upgraded		Singapore	Evergreen Marine (Singapore) Pte Ltd
Ever Leader	1987	9595503	15 January 2013	In service	Upgraded		Singapore	Evergreen Marine (Singapore) Pte Ltd
Ever Legacy	1988	9595515	8 March 2013	In service	Upgraded		Singapore	Evergreen Marine (Singapore) Pte Ltd
Ever Liven	1989	9595527	30 April 2013	In service			Taiwan	Evergreen Marine Corp. (Taiwan)
Ever Logic	1990	9604081	22 April 2013	In service	Upgraded		Taiwan	Evergreen Marine Corp. (Taiwan)
Ever Legend	1991	9604093	14 June 2013	In service	Upgraded		Singapore	Evergreen Asia (Singapore) Pte Ltd
Ever Learned	1992	9604108	26 June 2013	In service	Upgraded		United Kingdom	Evergreen Marine Corp. (Taiwan)
Ever Legion	1993	9604110	28 June 2013	In service			Singapore	Evergreen Marine (Singapore) Pte Ltd
Ever Lotus	1994	9604122	11 December 2013	In service			Panama	GreenCompass Marine S.A.
Ever Lively	1995	9604134	5 February 2014	In service	Upgraded		Singapore	Evergreen Marine (Singapore) Pte Ltd
Ever Lenient	1996	9604146	17 February 2014	In service	Upgraded		United Kingdom	Evergreen Marine Corp. (Taiwan)
Ever Loyal	1997	9604158	20 March 2014	In service	Upgraded		Taiwan	Evergreen Marine Corp. (Taiwan)
Ever Liberal	1998	9604160	14 May 2014	In service	Upgraded		United Kingdom	Evergreen Marine Corp. (Taiwan)
Ever Lucky	1999	9604172	8 July 2014	In service	Upgraded		Panama	GreenCompass Marine S.A.
CSBC
Ever Living	1007	9629031	30 August 2013	In service			Singapore	Evergreen Marine (Singapore) Pte Ltd.
Ever Linking	1008	9629043	30 October 2013	In service	Upgraded		United Kingdom	Evergreen Marine (Asia) Pte Ltd.
Ever Lucid	1009	9629055	15 January 2014	In service	Upgraded		Taiwan	Evergreen Marine Corp. (Taiwan)
Ever Lucent	1010	9629067	11 March 2014	In service			Singapore	Evergreen Marine (Singapore) Pte Ltd.
Ever Lissome	1011	9629079	15 May 2014	In service	Upgraded		United Kingdom	Evergreen Marine (Asia) Pte Ltd.
Ever Loading	1012	9629081	29 July 2014	In service	Upgraded		United Kingdom	Evergreen Marine (Asia) Pte Ltd.
Ever Lunar	1013	9629093	9 January 2015	In service	Upgraded		Taiwan	Evergreen Marine Corp. (Taiwan)
Ever Lyric	1014	9629108	15 April 2015	In service	Upgraded		Taiwan	Evergreen Marine Corp. (Taiwan)
Ever Lovely	1015	9629110	30 June 2015	In service	Upgraded		Singapore	Evergreen Marine (Singapore) Pte Ltd.
Ever Lifting	1016	9629122	31 August 2015	In service	Upgraded		United Kingdom	Evergreen Marine (Asia) Pte Ltd.
