= Evergreen S-class container ship =

Container ship class

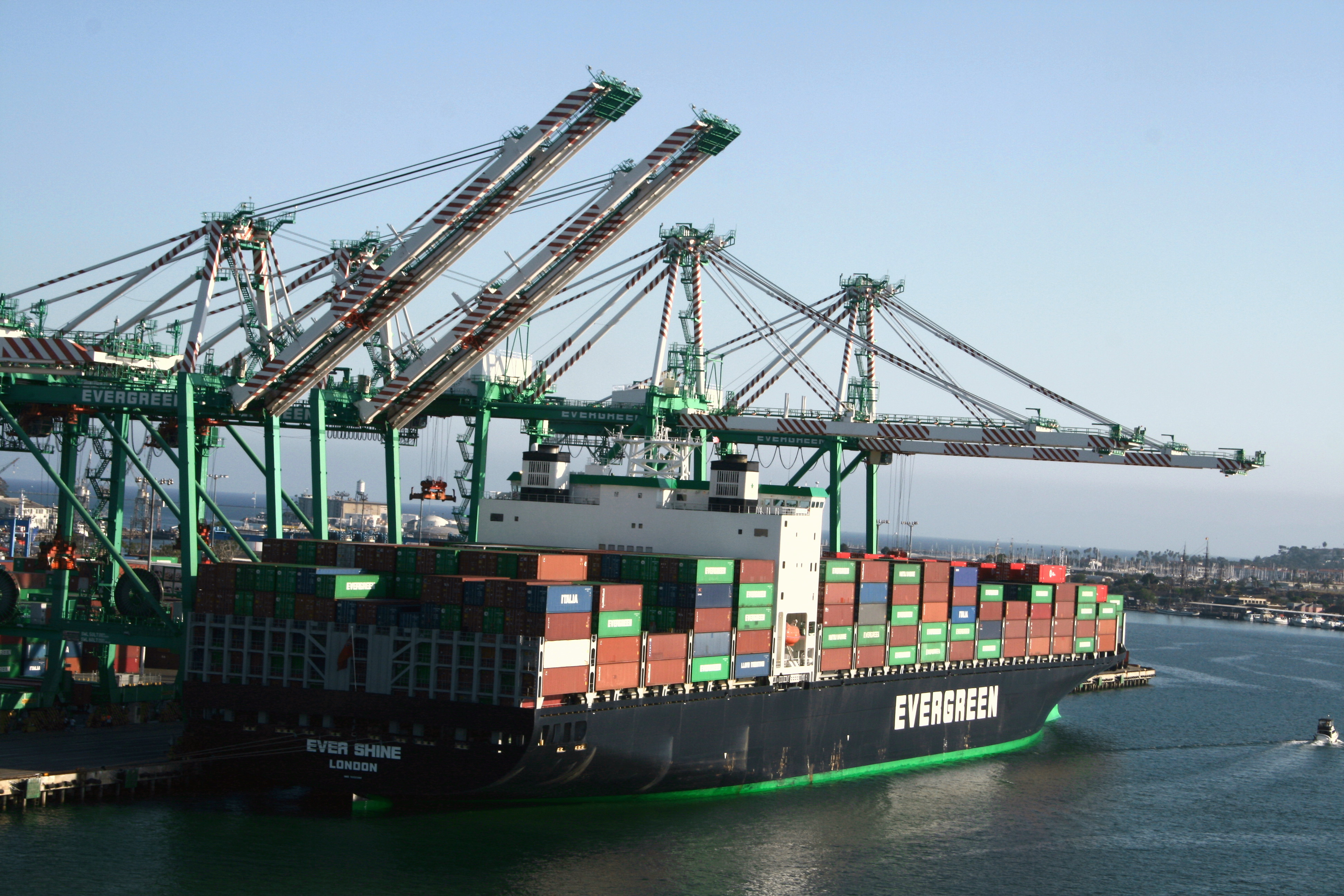

Class overview
- Builders: Mitsubishi Heavy Industries
- Operators: Evergreen Marine
- In service: 2005–present
- Planned: 10
- Completed: 10
- Active: 10

General characteristics
- Type: Container ship
- Tonnage: 76,185 GT
- Length: 300 m (980 ft)
- Beam: 42.8 m (140 ft)
- Draft: 14.2 m (47 ft)
- Capacity: 6,944 TEU

The Evergreen S class is a series of 10 container ships built for Evergreen Marine. The ships were built by Mitsubishi Heavy Industries at their Kobe shipyard in Japan. The ships have a maximum theoretical capacity of around 6,944 twenty-foot equivalent units (TEU).

== List of ships ==
Ship name	Previous names	Yard number	IMO number	Delivered	Status	Ref.
Ever Shine	Hatsu Shine (2005–2008)	1265	9300386	27 September 2005	In service	
Ever Sigma	Hatsu Sigma (2005–2008)	1266	9300398	14 November 2005	In service	
Ever Smart	Hatsu Smart (2006–2009)	1267	9300403	2 March 2006	In service	
Ever Smile	Hatsu Smile (2006–2009)	1268	9300415	2 June 2006	In service	
Ever Superb		1269	9300427	31 August 2006	In service	
Ever Steady		1271	9300439	26 December 2006	In service	
Ever Strong		1272	9300441	27 March 2007	In service	
Ever Summit		1273	9300453	26 June 2007	In service	
Ever Safety		1274	9300465	5 October 2007	In service	
Ever Salute		1275	9300477	11 January 2008	In service	
