= Imabari Shipbuilding =

Japanese shipbuilder

Imabari Shipbuilding Co., Ltd.

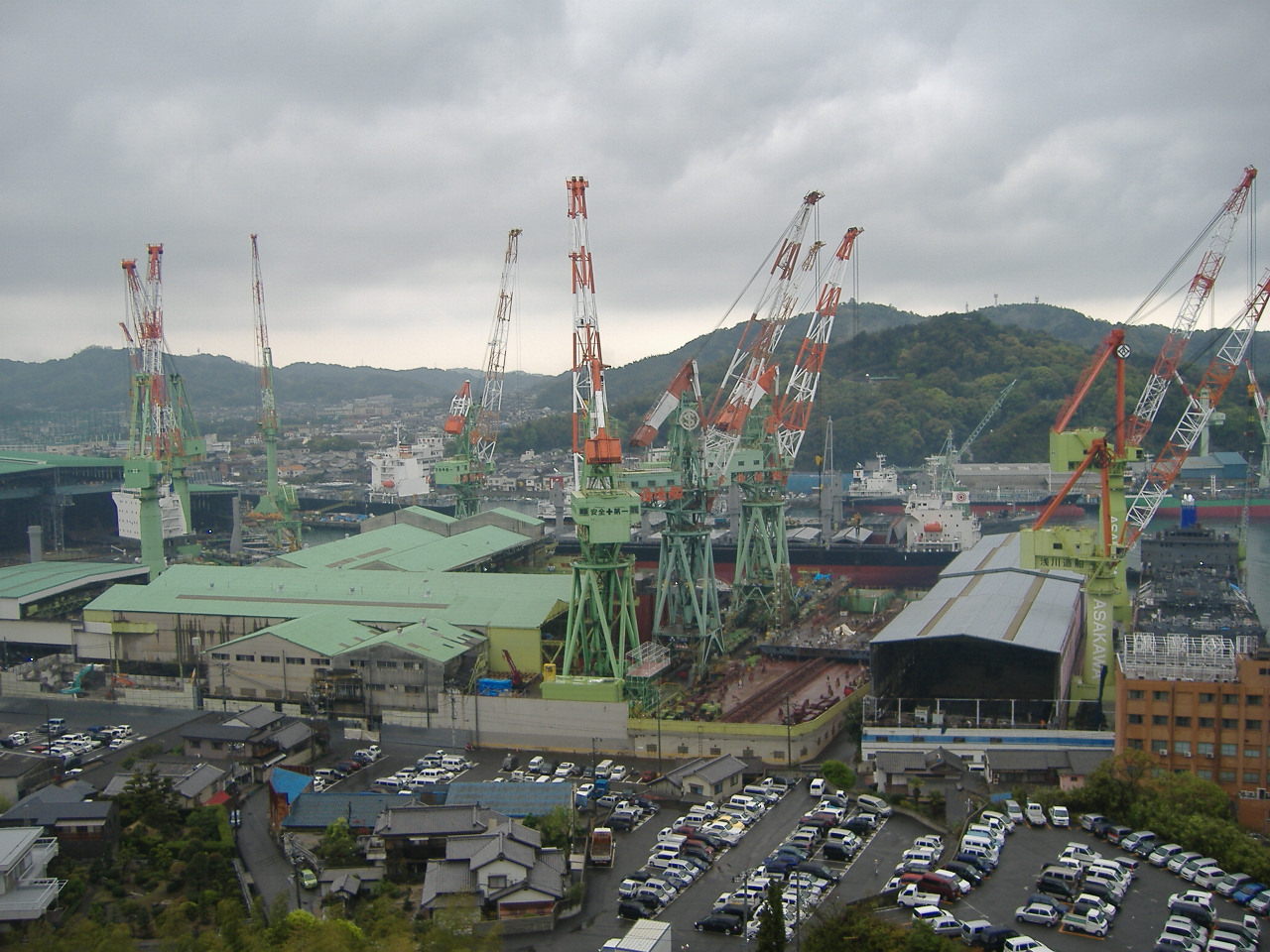
- Native name: 今治造船株式会社
- Romanized name: Imabari Zōsen kabushiki gaisha
- Type: Private (Kabushiki gaisha)
- Industry: Shipbuilding
- Founded: 1901
- Headquarters: Imabari, Ehime, Japan
- Area served: Global
- Key people: Toshiyuki Higaki (Chairman); Yukito Higaki (President)
- Owner: Higaki family
- Subsidiaries: Japan Marine United:60%
- Website: http://www.imazo.co.jp

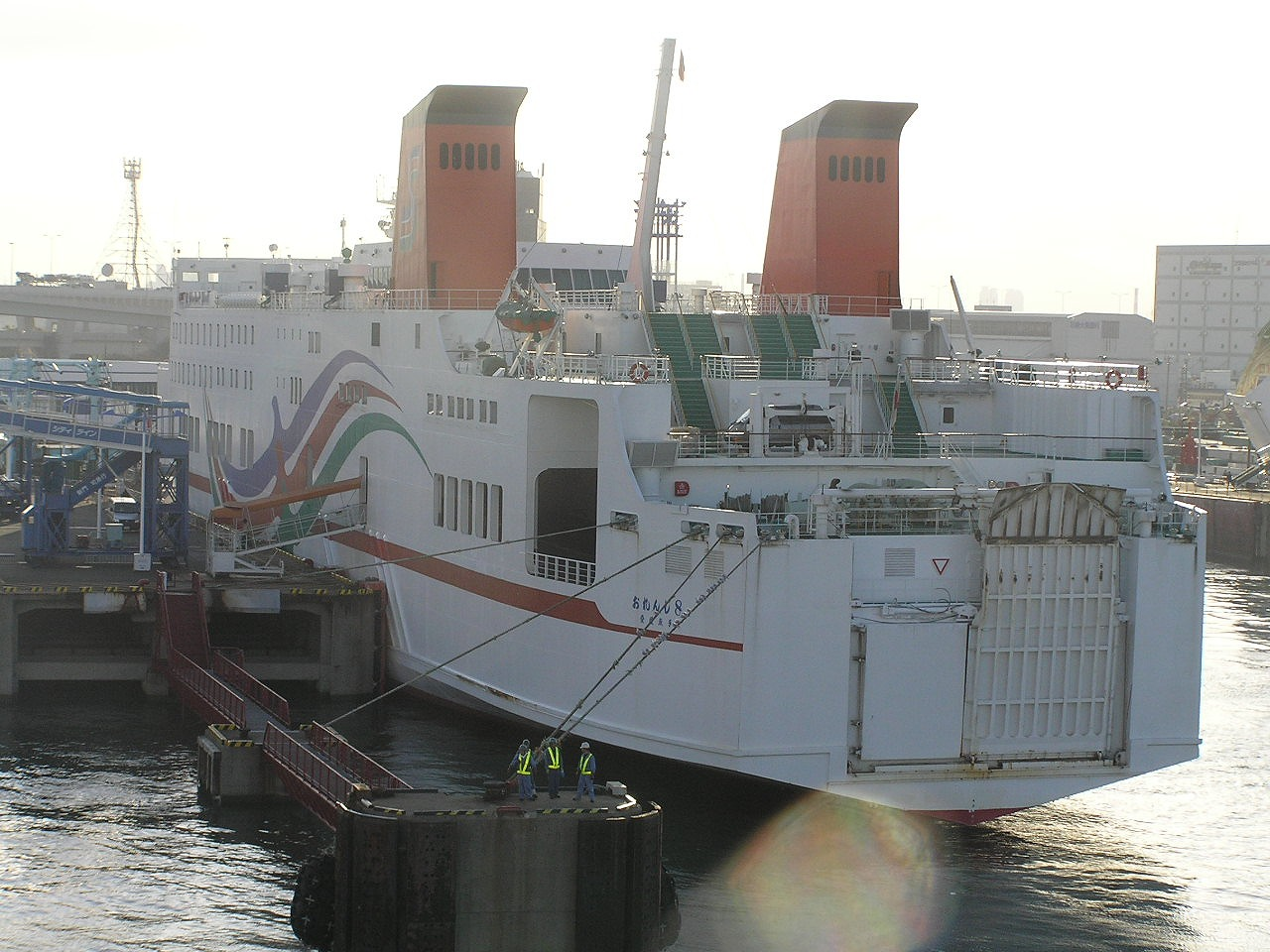
Shikoku Development Ferry "Orange 8"

Imabari Shipbuilding (今治造船株式会社, Imabari Zōsen kabushiki gaisha) is a major Japanese ship building, marine engineering, and service company headquartered in Imabari, Ehime Prefecture, Japan.

It is Japan's largest shipbuilder both in terms of tonnage and sales revenue, with design, research, construction and ship repair facilities in Imabari, Marugame and at seven other integrated dockyard and manufacturing facilities across the Seto Inland Sea region.

Imabari Shipbuilding's products include the design, manufacture, purchase and sale of merchant ships, offshore engineering and ship life cycle services.

Imabari Shipbuilding also controls various subsidiaries related to the shipbuilding and shipping industries, including one of the largest Japanese ship owning, managing, and leasing (chartering) companies Shoei Kisen Kaisha, which manages and provides ships to shipping companies under long term charterparty agreements.

The company is privately held and tightly controlled and run by the Higaki family. In 2016 it reported commercial vessel production as measured by cargo-carrying capacity for a total of about 4 million tons, six times more than Mitsubishi Heavy and seven times more than Mitsui Engineering. Its revenue in that year totaled 373.4 billion yen ($3.43 billion). Globally, it boasts the fourth-largest market share, after South Korean rivals Hyundai Heavy Industries and Daewoo Shipbuilding & Marine Engineering.

== History ==
First established in 1901, shipbuilding facilities in Ehime Prefecture were consolidated under the Imabari Shipbuilding name in 1942.

Over its existence, Imabari has acquired some of its competitors, including, lately, in 2018, the Japanese shipbuilder Minaminippon Shipbuilding Co., Ltd. Minaminippon is based in Ōita Prefecture on the southern island of Kyushu, and was formerly controlled by the Mitsui group through its affiliates Mitsui Engineering & Shipbuilding Co., Ltd. (25 percent) and Mitsui O.S.K. Lines, Ltd. (24 percent).

On January 1, 2021, Imabari Shipbuilding (with 51% of shares) merged into a new joint venture with Japan Marine United ('JMU') (with 49% of shares) named Nihon Shipyard, covering all ship types except LNG tankers. Nihon Shipyard is headquartered in Tokyo, with a staff of 500. In parallel, Imabari Shipbuilding bought 35% of JMU's capital. Nihon Shipyard designs, builds and promotes zero-emission vessels.

The cooperation between these two Japanese companies make it one of the largest marine engineering and shipbuilding companies in the world.

On January 2026, Imabari increased its shares in JMU to 60%.

== Current facilities ==
Imabari Shipbuilding currently operates nine ship building and maintenance facilities as well as marketing offices in Tokyo and Amsterdam.

Plans were announced in January 2015 to build a new purpose-built dry dock facility at Marugame for the fabrication of a new generation of container ships in excess of 20,000 TEU. The facility was completed in 2017, measuring 610 meters (2,000 feet) long, 80 meters (260 feet) wide, and 11.7 meters (38 feet) deep, and costing 400 billion yen.

== See also ==
- Evergreen G-class container ship
- MV Maritime Queen
