= CSCL =

CSCL can refer to:

- Caesium chloride (CsCl), a chemical compound.
- Computer Supported Collaborative Learning, a research topic on supporting collaborative learning with the assistance of computer artifacts.
- China Shipping Container Lines, a containerized marine shipping company, based in Shanghai China.
