= Peony-class container ship =

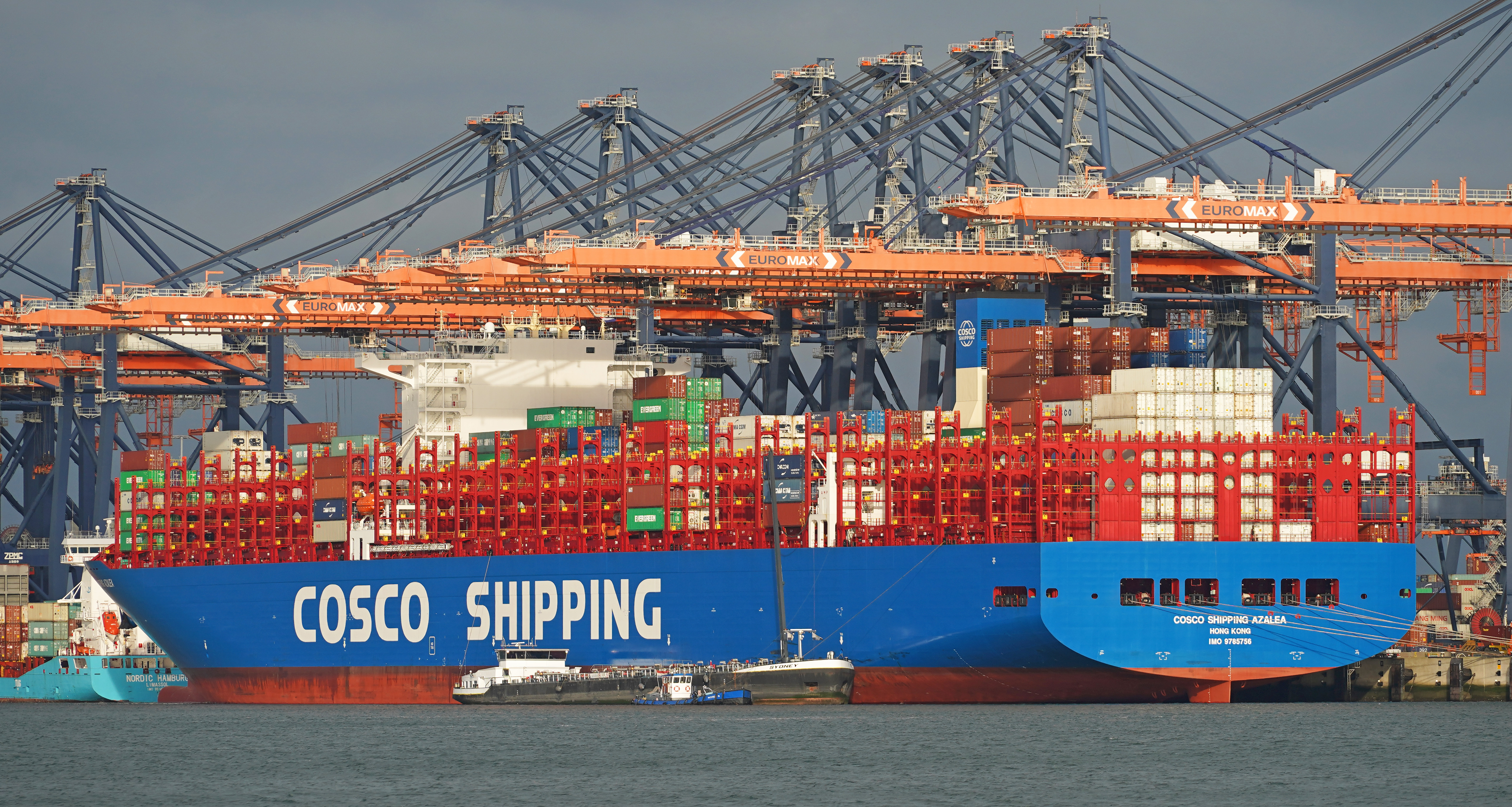
- COSCO Shipping Azalea in the port of Rotterdam

Class overview
- Builders: Shanghai Jiangnan Changxing Shipbuilding
- Operators: COSCO SHIPPING Lines
- In service: 2018-present
- Completed: 8
- Active: 8

General characteristics
- Type: Container ship
- Tonnage: 143,179 GT
- Length: 366 m (1,201 ft)
- Beam: 48.2 m (158 ft)
- Draught: 13.5 m (44 ft)
- Propulsion: MAN 11S90ME-C10.5
- Capacity: 13,800 TEU

The Peony class is a series of 8 container ships built for COSCO SHIPPING Lines. The ships have a maximum theoretical capacity of 13,800 TEU. The ships were built by Shanghai Jiangnan Changxing Shipbuilding at their shipyard in Shanghai.

The ships were originally ordered by China Shipping Container Lines (CSCL) in 2015 at a total cost of 934.4 million USD.

== List of ships ==
Ship	Yard number	IMO number	Delivery	Status	ref
COSCO Shipping Peony	3025	9785744	31 May 2018	In service	
COSCO Shipping Jasmine	3026	9785768	7 Aug 2018	In service	
COSCO Shipping Azalea	3027	9785756	26 Apr 2019	In service	
COSCO Shipping Rose	3028	9785809	26 Sep 2018	In service	
COSCO Shipping Camellia	3029	9785782	10 May 2019	In service	
COSCO Shipping Sakura	3030	9785794	11 Dec 2018	In service	
COSCO Shipping Orchid	3031	9785770	30 Aug 2019	In service	
COSCO Shipping Lotus	3032	9785811	8 May 2019	In service	
