= COSCO Shipping Development =

Chinese financing and logistics firm

COSCO SHIPPING Development Co., Ltd
- Native name: 中远海运发展股份有限公司
- Formerly: China Shipping Container Lines
- Type: Public
- Traded as: SEHK: 2866; SSE: 601866
- Industry: Shipping and logistics
- Founded: 1997
- Headquarters: Shanghai, China
- Key people: Wang Daxiong (Chairman)
- Products: Container leasing; Chartering; Container manufacturing; Insurance brokerage
- Owner: Cosco Shipping (via China Shipping Group)
- Parent: China Shipping Group
- Website: en.development.coscoshipping.com

COSCO Shipping Development Co., Ltd., stylized as COSCO SHIPPING Development is a financial services company based in Shanghai, China. It was known as China Shipping Container Lines (CSCL) and was among the world's largest container liner companies. It exited the container shipping business and was renamed to COSCO SHIPPING Development because of the COSCO-China Shipping merger in 2016. As CSCL, the company was ranked 1503rd in 2012 edition of Forbes Global 2000.

== History ==
In 1997, the Chinese government founded China Shipping Group as a SOE. That same year, China Shipping Container Lines Co. Ltd (CSCL) was founded in Shanghai as a subsidiary of China Shipping Group.

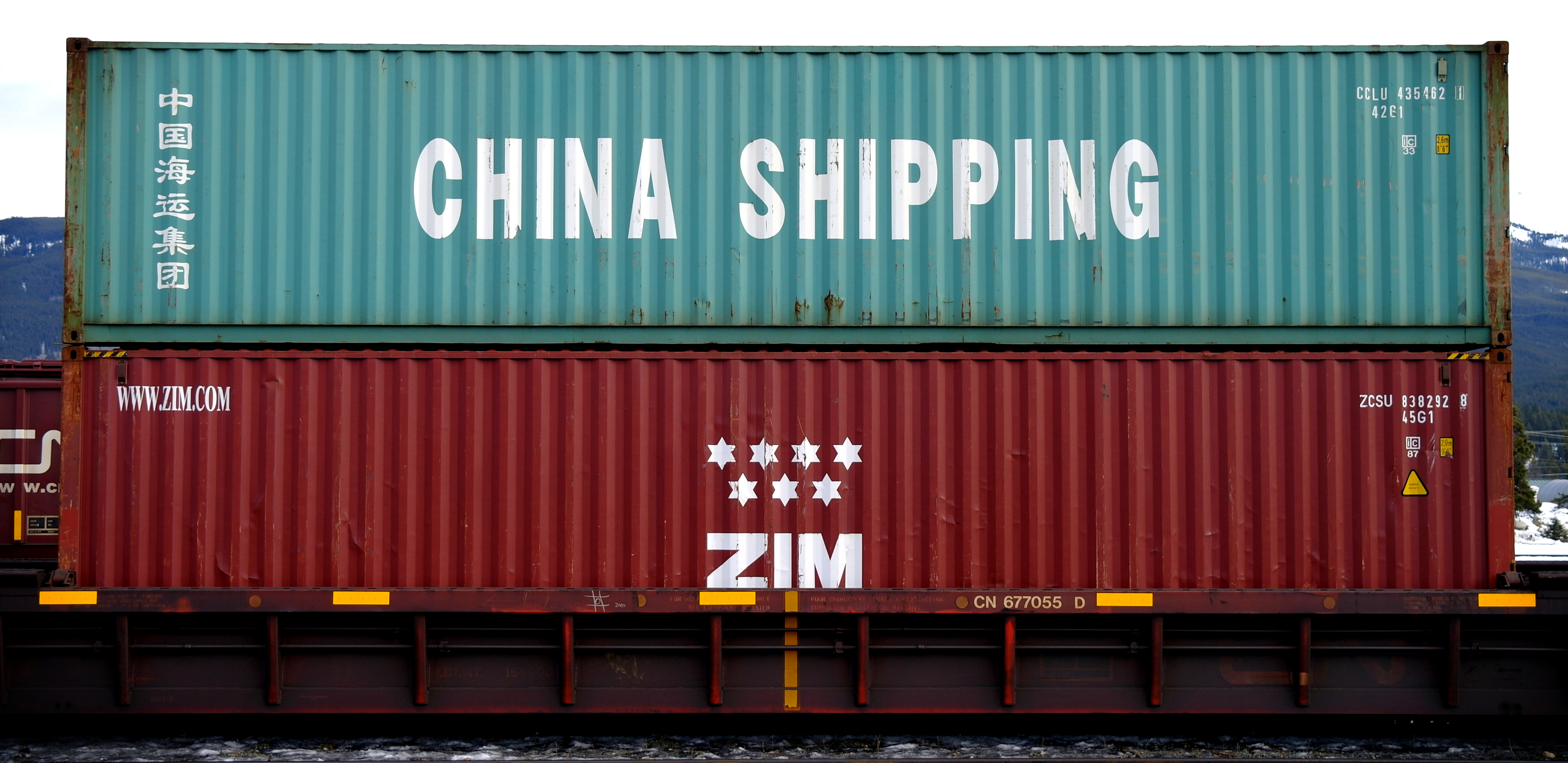
China Shipping container

After China joined the WTO in 2001, CSCL grew rapidly, playing a major role in supporting China's economic advancement and international trade. With continued support from the Chinese government, CSCL's global TEU market share increased 126% between 2000 and 2006, becoming the second fastest growing container carrier in the world. In 2004, CSCL became the world's tenth largest ocean container line in terms of TEU capacity, and in 2007, it became the world's sixth largest. In 2005, CSCL was named the “World’s Most Profitable Container Liner Company” by the journal American Shipper. In 2007 and again in 2008, Long Beach Port Authority awarded CSCL the 'Honor of Environmental Protection'. In 2009, CSCL was awarded the 'Best Annual Carrier' by Michaels Stores.

In China, CSCL had in-house trucking companies, a container yard, and the company called on 12 Chinese seaports and several riverports. The company owned assets in dozens of countries. Over the years, CSCL developed a large intermodal network in the US by contracting with trucking companies and all major US railroads. In May 2001, CSCL, Marine Terminal Corporation, and BNSF Railway announced a twice-weekly on-dock train service to deliver China Shipping containers from the Port of Los Angeles to Chicago, IL.

CSCL first went public in 2004 on the Hong Kong Stock Exchange, issuing 2.42 billion shares. CSCL made another IPO in 2007 on the Shanghai Stock Exchange. CSCL's early successes were credited to the leadership of Captain Li Kelin. In 2006, after Kelin retired, Li Shaode – who had 40 years of experience in the shipping industry – was appointed chairman of CSCL. Shaode along with other veteran members of the leadership team continued CSCL's tradition of success. As China increasingly became the world's factory, CSCL played a significant role in transporting exports of consumer goods and imports of recycled material from developed countries.

On July 1, 2013, CSCL suspended all its services in Iran due to US sanctions. In 2014, CSCL along with CMA CGM and United Arab Shipping formed the Ocean Three Alliance – a business agreement to share vessel space. In December 2014, CSCL christened the 19,100 TEU CSCL Globe, the world's largest container ship at the time. By May 2014, China Shipping Container Line's service profile consisted of 40 routes including trans-Pacific, trans-Atlantic, Asia-Europe, Asia-Africa, and intra-Asia routes and a fleet of 148 container vessels totaling 656,000 TEUs.

In February 2016, CSCL's parent company, China Shipping Group completed a merger with COSCO Group to form COSCO SHIPPING Group. CSCL's assets were transferred to the container shipping branch of COSCO Group, COSCO Container Lines. CSCL's shareholders approved 100% acquisition of Florens Container Lease, the container leasing subsidiary of COSCO Group and Dong Fang International Investment, the container leasing subsidiary of China Shipping Group. CSCL's shareholders also approved taking over the ship leasing subsidiary of China Shipping Group, Oriental Fleet International Ltd. As a result, CSCL was renamed COSCO SHIPPING Development Co. and became a holding company for COSCO SHIPPING's container and ship leasing business.

== Services ==
The company provides container and ship leasing, container manufacturing, marine insurance brokerage, and risk management for ocean shipping companies.

COSCO SHIPPING Development owns Florens Asset Management, one of the world's leading lessors of intermodal shipping containers. As of March 2020, Florens' container fleet consisted of 3.65 million TEUs. Florens leases dry containers, reefers, open-top containers, and flat racks on short- and long-term leases. Florens Asset Management was founded in 1987 and was previously a wholly owned subsidiary of COSCO Group. Florens also incorporates the container fleet of Dong Fang International Asset Management, which was owned by China Shipping Group.

== Fleet ==
Container ship classes of China Shipping Container Lines
Ship class	Built	Capacity (TEU)	Ships in class	Notes
Star-class	2011-2012	14,074	8	Currently operated by COSCO SHIPPING Lines
Globe class	2014-2015	18,982	5	Currently operated by COSCO SHIPPING Lines
Peony-class	2018-2019	13,800	8	Currently operated by COSCO SHIPPING Lines
Universe-class	2018-2019	21,237	6	Currently operated by COSCO SHIPPING Lines

== Accidents and incidents ==
=== CSCL Jupiter ===
On 14 August 2017, the container ship CSCL Jupiter ran aground near Bath, Netherlands shortly after departing from the port of Antwerp headed for Hamburg, Germany. The grounding resulted in the suspension of all shipping traffic to and from the port. Following the successful re-floating operation, the ship was led to the port of Antwerp, to undergo an inspection.

== Gallery ==
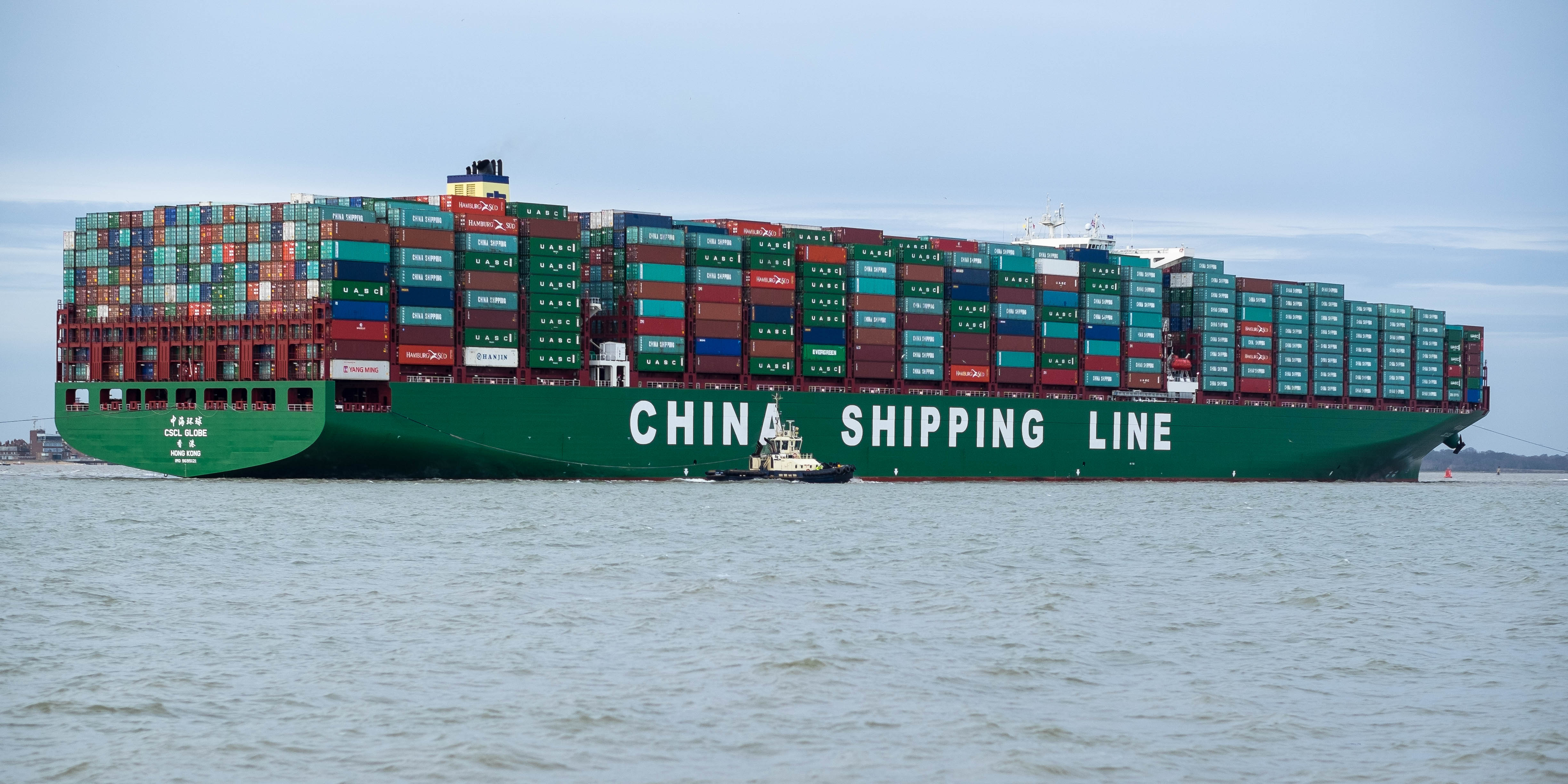
CSCL Globe at the Port of Felixstowe, UK

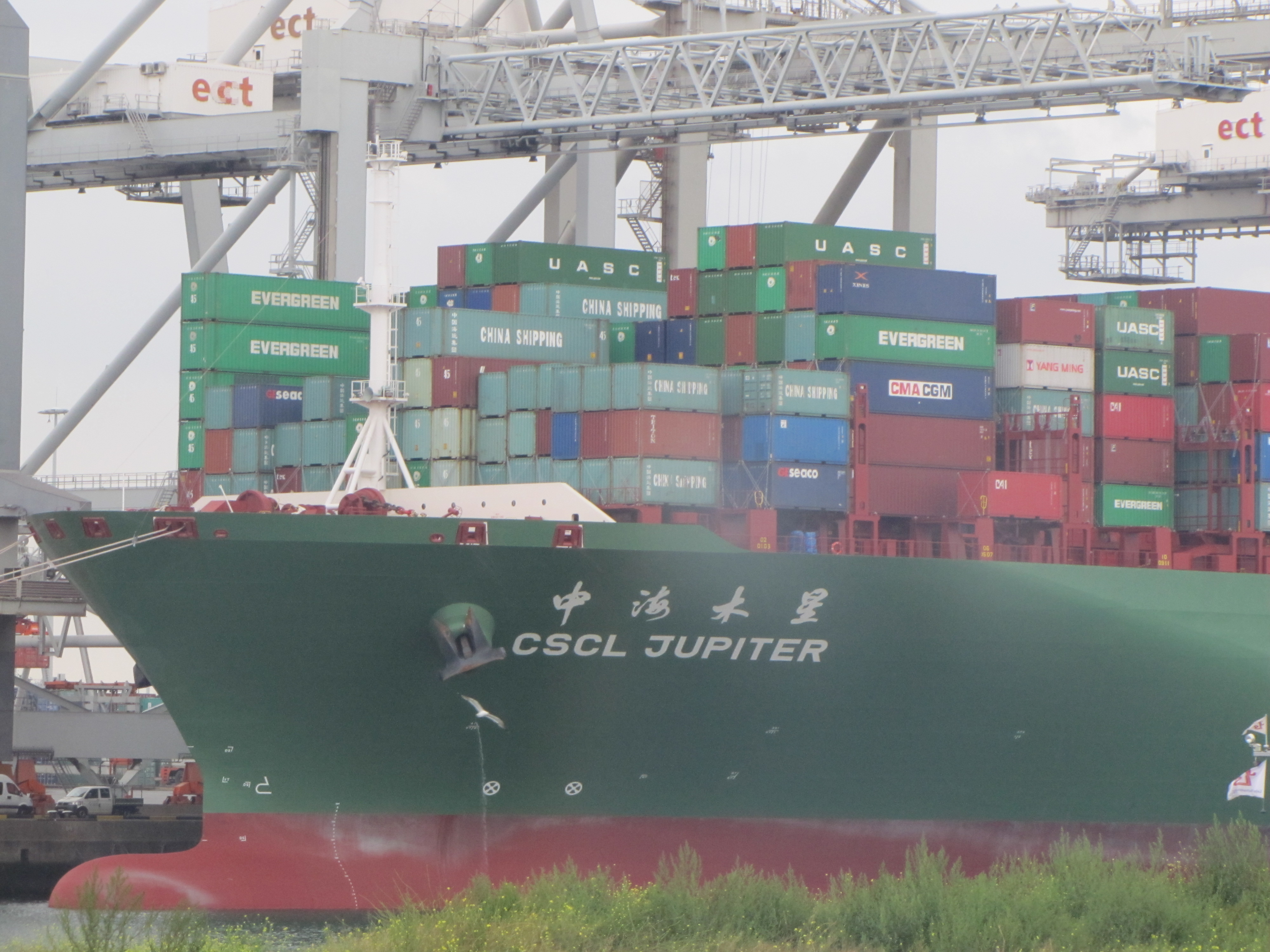
Bow of the CSCL Jupiter, one of the container ships operated by CSCL

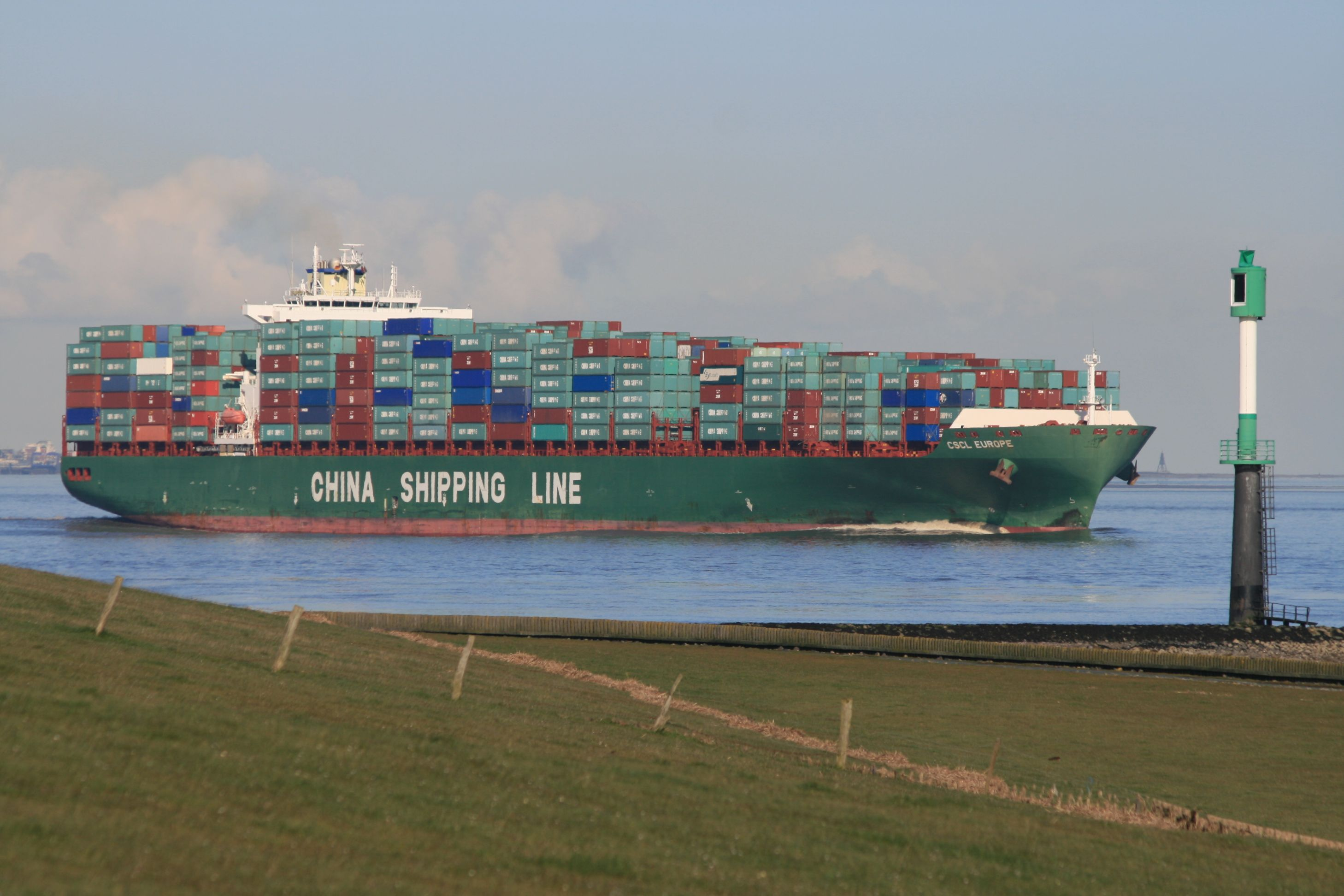
CSCL Europe near Glameyer Stack

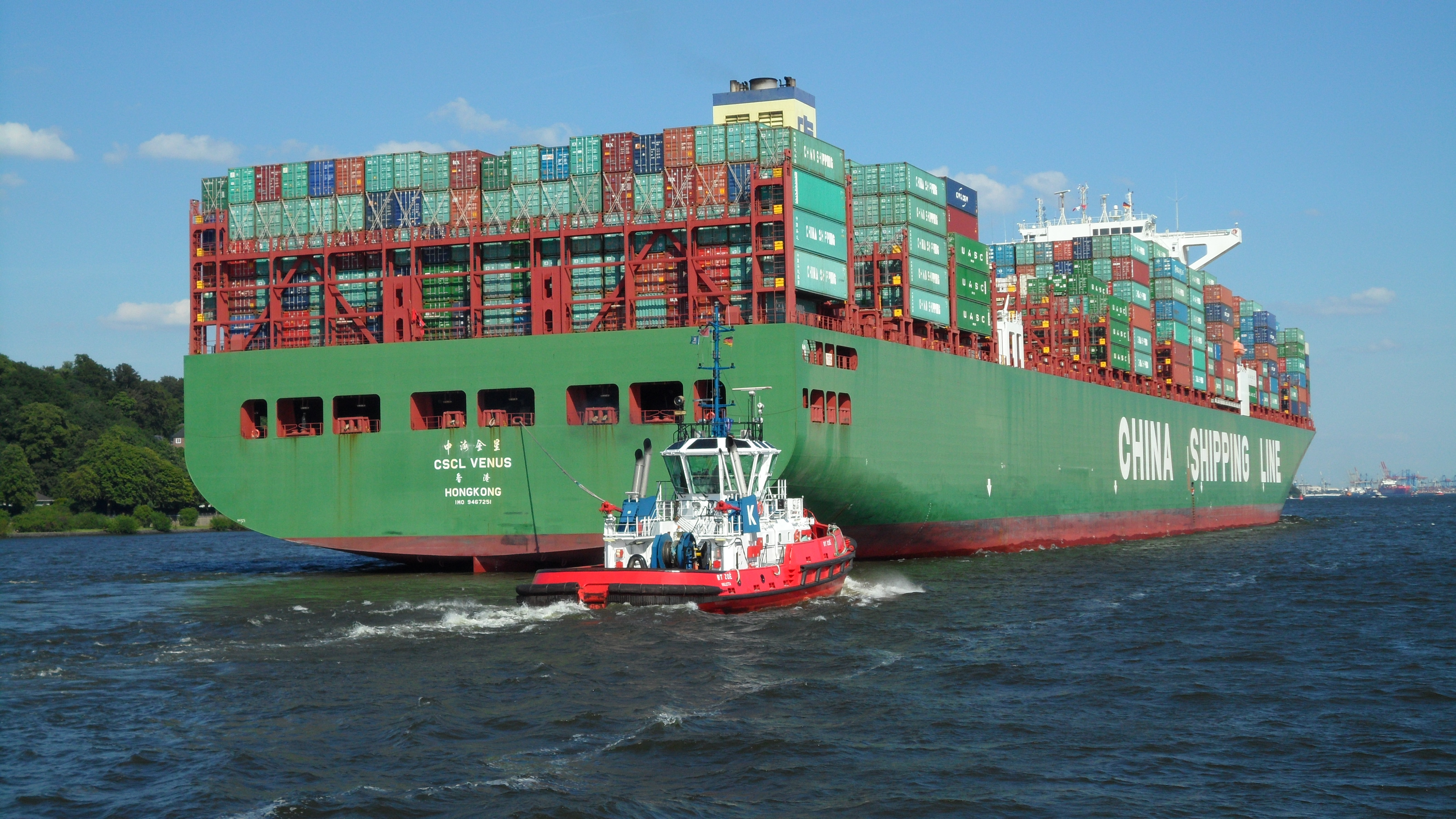
CSCL Venus on the Elbe with Destination Hamburg

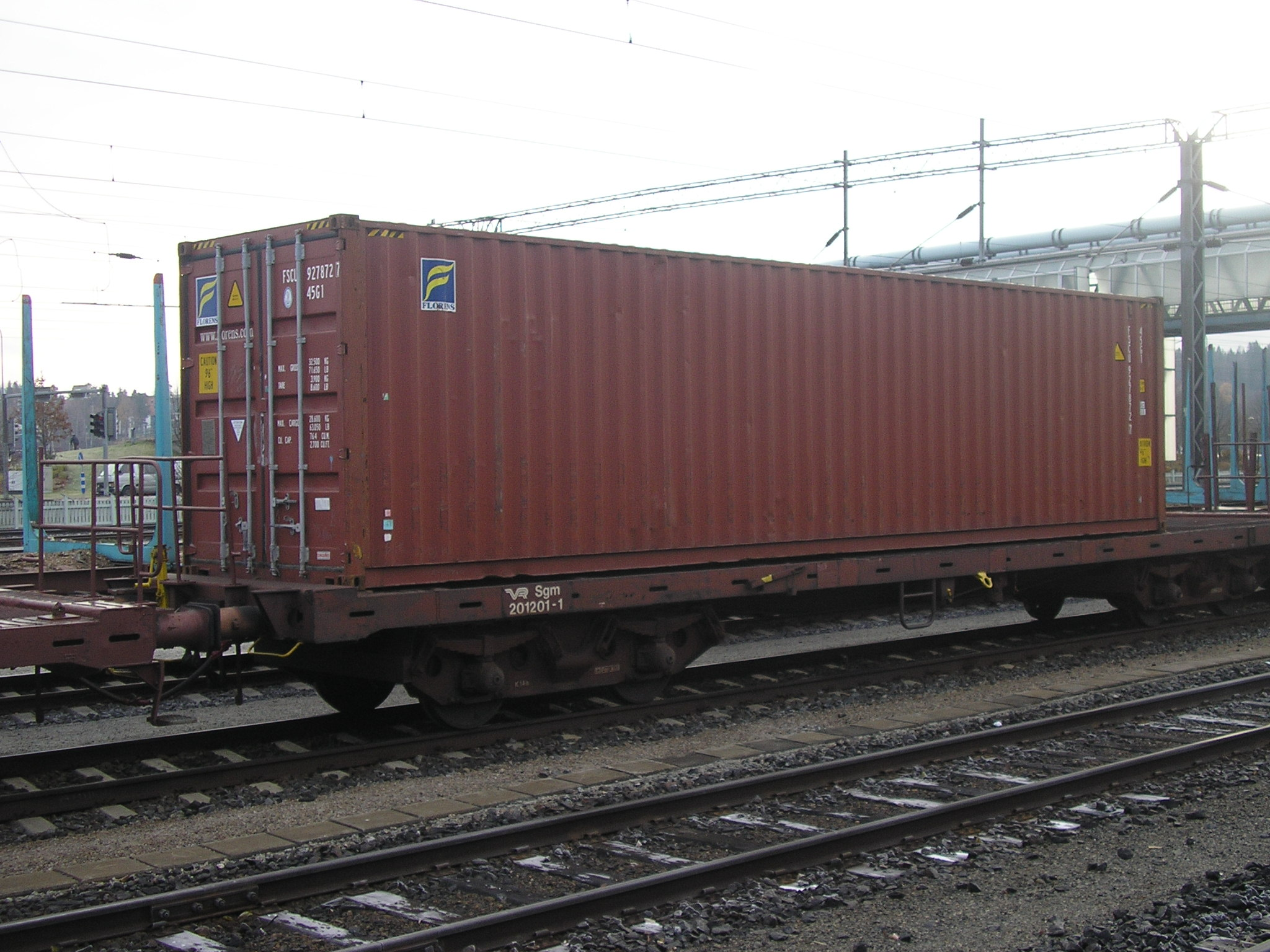
Florens container at Jyväskylä railway station

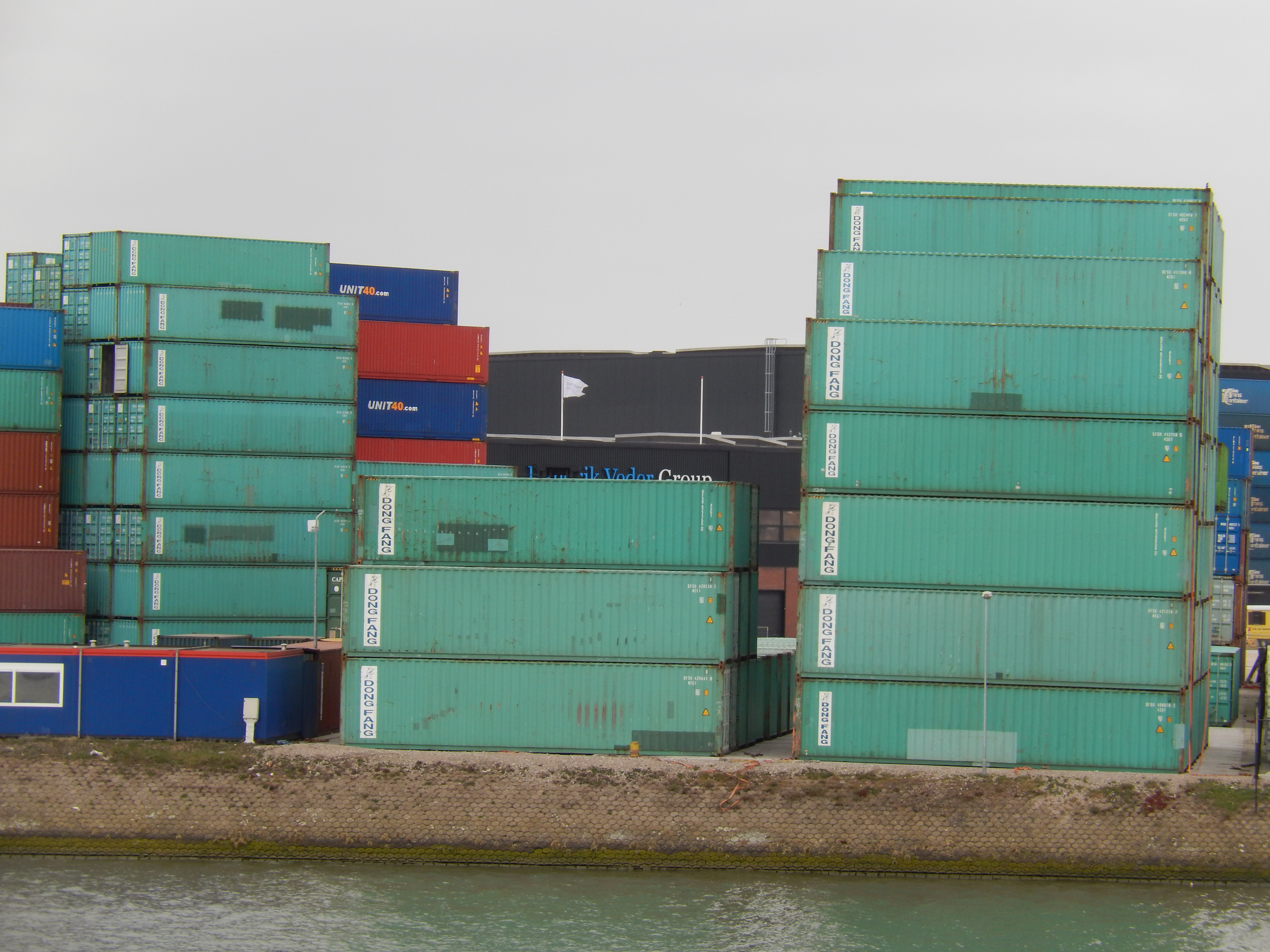
Dong Fang containers in Rotterdam

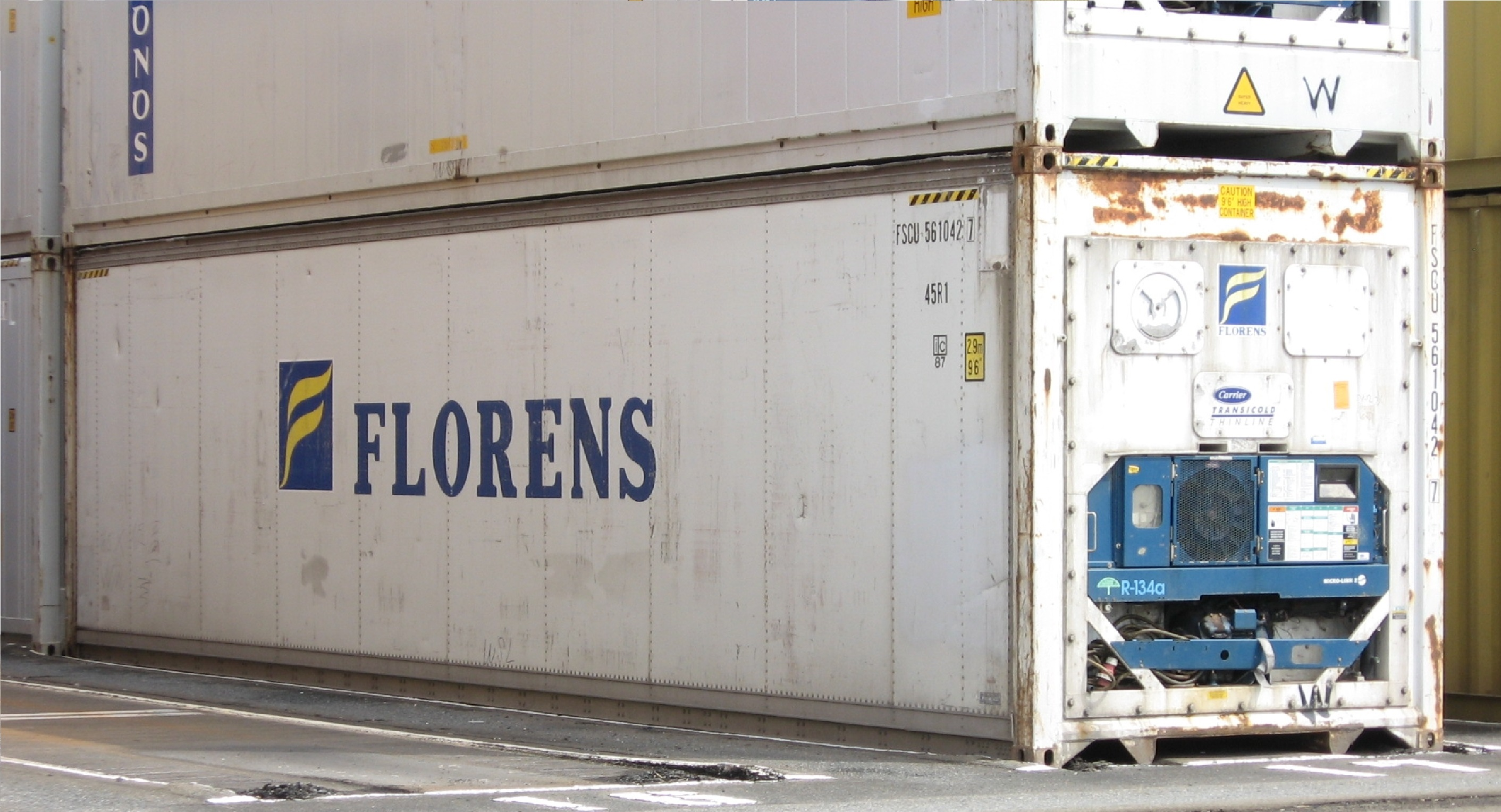
Florens reefer
