= COSCO Shipping Lines =

Chinese container shipping company

COSCO SHIPPING Lines Co., Ltd.
- Native name: 中远海运集装箱运输有限公司
- Company type: State-owned enterprise
- Industry: Maritime transport, Container shipping
- Founded: 2016; 10 years ago
- Headquarters: Shanghai, China
- Area served: Worldwide
- Key people: Yanghao Zhijian (CEO)
- Products: Container shipping
- Parent: COSCO Shipping Holdings
- Website: lines.coscoshipping.com

COSCO SHIPPING Lines Co., Ltd. (Chinese: 中远海运集运) is a Chinese international container transportation and shipping company. It is a subsidiary of COSCO Shipping Holdings, and its parent company is China's state-owned COSCO Shipping.

== History ==
In April 1961 China's Ministry of Communications established China Ocean Shipping Company (COSCO) as a state-owned ocean shipping enterprise in Beijing. In 1964 China Ocean Shipping Co. established a subsidiary in Shanghai, COSCO Shanghai, which later specialized in container shipping.

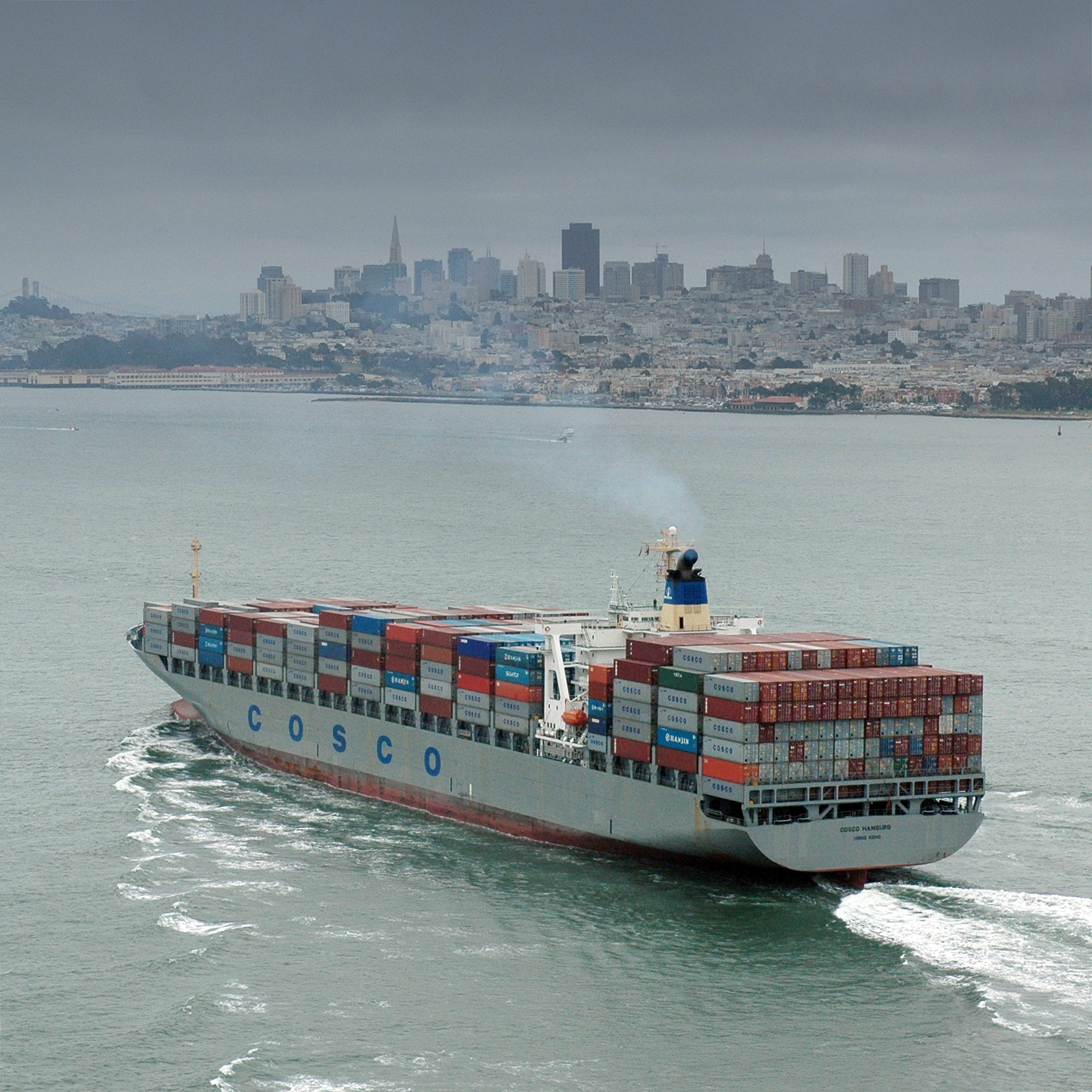
Container ship COSCO Hamburg, San Francisco, California, 2007

In 1978, COSCO Shanghai's MV Ping Xiang Cheng transported 162 TEU from Shanghai to Sydney, Australia, which was the first international container voyage by a Chinese company. Thereafter, COSCO Shanghai commenced a monthly container service running two 200 TEU container ships between Shanghai, Xingang, Sydney, and Melbourne.

In 1982 COSCO Shanghai began regular trans-Pacific container services and in 1983 COSCO Shanghai started a new container trade route connecting Tianjin Port and Shanghai with ports in West Europe.

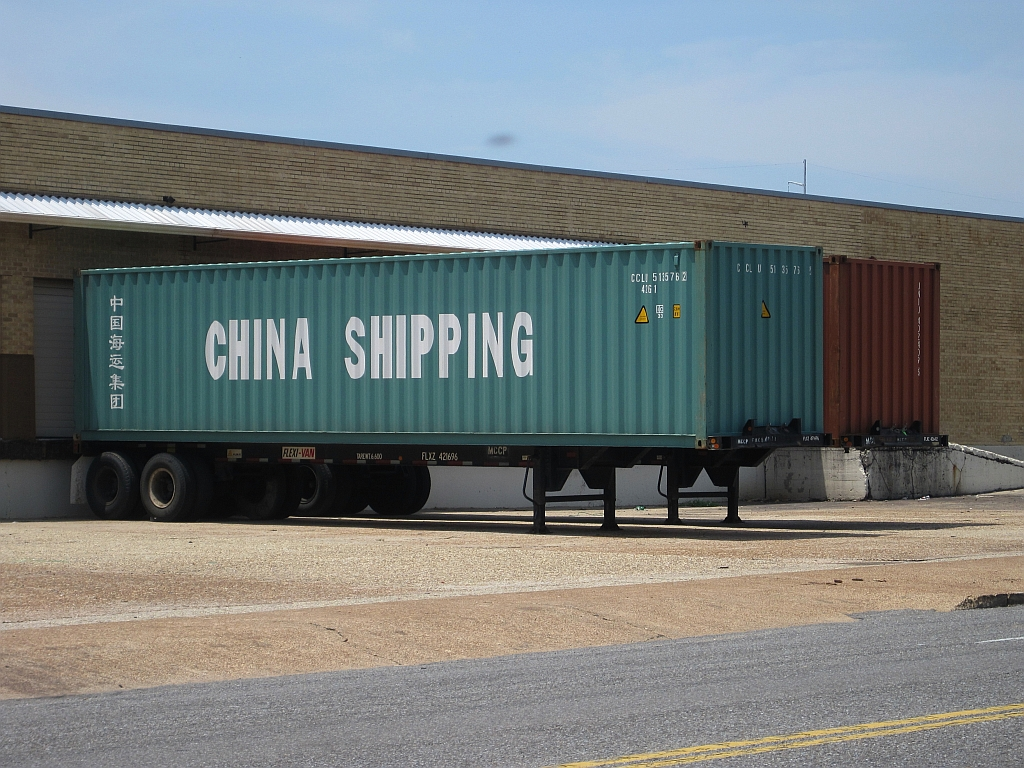
CSCL container at a warehouse loading dock.

In 1994, COSCO Container Line Limited (COSCON), was formed to conduct COSCO's container operations in collaboration with regional subsidiaries such as the Shanghai branch. In November 1997, COSCON merged with COSCO Shanghai and became the sole container shipping subsidiary of COSCO. That same year, the Chinese government founded the SOE China Shipping Group along with its container shipping subsidiary, China Shipping Container Lines (CSCL).

CSCL grew its business rapidly under the leadership of shipping industry veteran, Captain Li Kelin. The company saw its TEU market share increase 126% between 2000 and 2006, and by 2007 it became the sixth largest container transportation company in the world in terms of fleet capacity.

COSCON established local offices and agencies in 160 countries. In North America, the company built a large intermodal network by investing in thousands of marine container chassis and contracting with trucking companies and major North American railroads. Likewise, CSCL developed a large intermodal network in the US, and in 2001 BNSF Railway announced a new double-stack service to transport China Shipping containers from the Port of Los Angeles to the BNSF Chicago yards.

In July 2007, COSCON named the 10,000 TEU COSCO Asia at HHI shipyard in Ulsan. It was the largest container ship in COSCO's fleet at the time and the company later took delivery of three other 10,000 TEU ships. The 10,000 TEU vessels were highly automated and classed by Lloyd's Register to the highest environmental safety standards.

By December 2013, the trans-Pacific service generated the most revenue for COSCON, RMB 14.2 million. Meanwhile, by May 2014 CSCL operated 40 overseas routes with a fleet of 148 container ships representing 656,000 TEU.

=== COSCO SHIPPING Lines ===
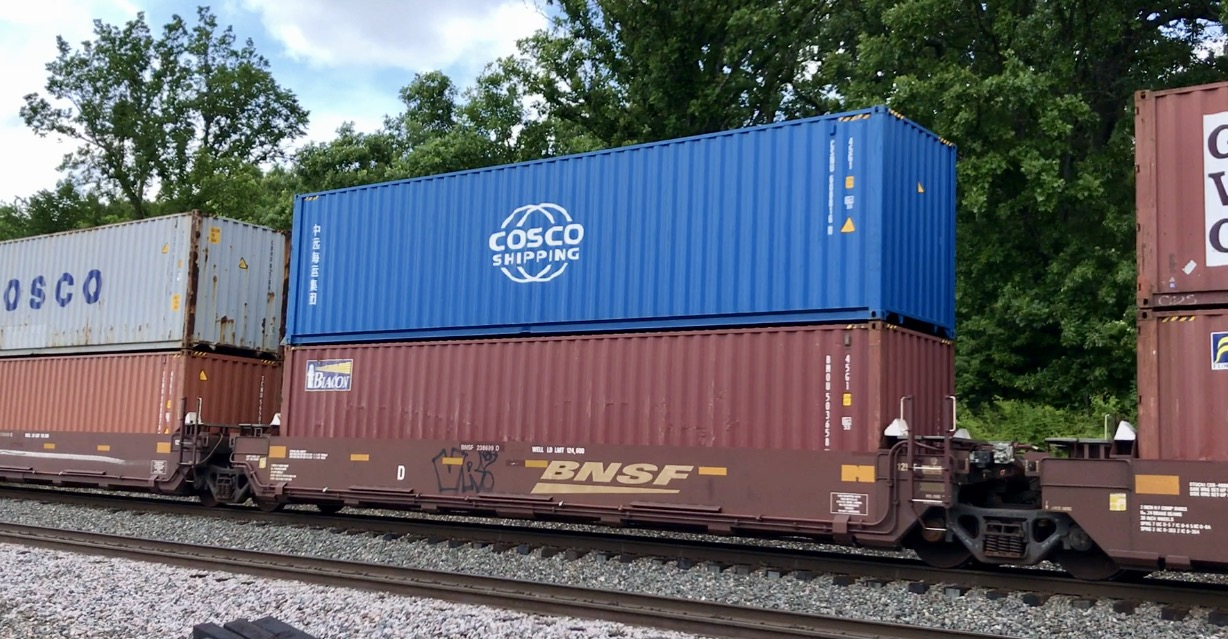
COSCO SHIPPING container in transport on an intermodal freight train

In March 2016 the parent company of COSCON, COSCO Group, merged with the parent company of CSCL, China Shipping Group. Before the merger, COSCON and CSCL were the largest and second largest container lines in China, respectively. As a result of the merger, COSCON acquired the assets of CSCL and was renamed COSCO SHIPPING Lines. Meanwhile, CSCL acquired the container leasing subsidiaries of China Shipping Group and COSCO Group, and became a container leasing company. The newly created COSCO Shipping Lines has 502 container ships with 3.0 million TEU. The company has 255 international routes, calling at 356 ports in 105 countries., COSCO SHIPPING Lines has ordered several mega-ships, such as the 20,000 TEU COSCO Shipping Taurus and the 21,000 TEU Universe-class container ships.

On June 26, 2016, COSCO Shipping Panama became the first vessel to sail through the newly widened Panama Canal. Over 5,000 people attended the event.

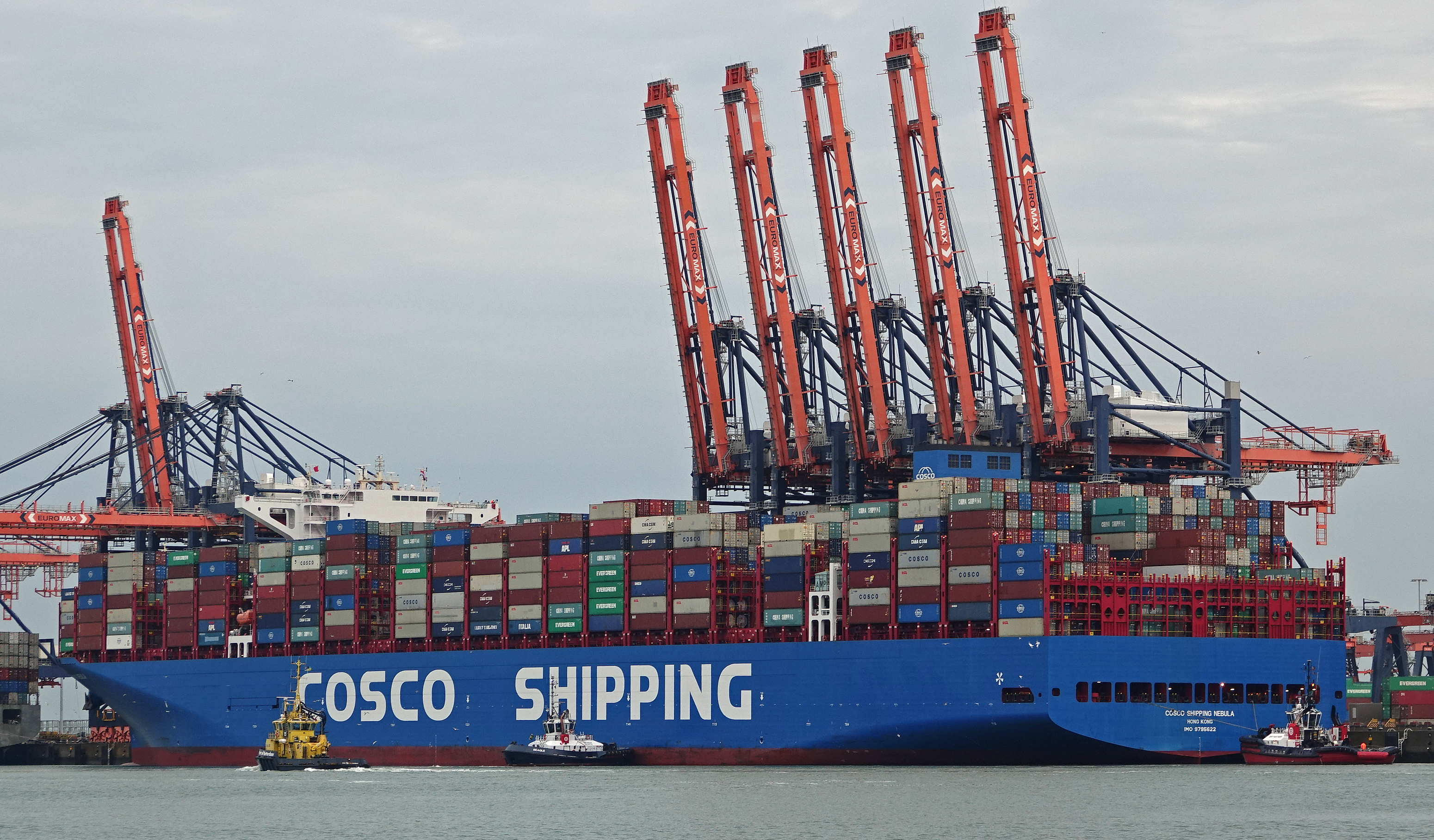
COSCO SHIPPING Nebula at Euromax terminal, December 17, 2019

From 1997, COSCON was a member of the CKYHE alliance, a pooling agreement to share vessel space with "K" Line, Yang Ming, Hanjin, and Evergreen. Meanwhile, CSCL was a member of the Ocean Three Alliance along with CMA CGM and UASC. After the 2016 COSCO-China Shipping merger, COSCO SHIPPING Lines formed a new 5-year vessel-sharing contract, the Ocean Alliance, along with CMA CGM, OOCL, and Evergreen.

On July 24, 2018, COSCO SHIPPING Lines reported a cyber attack to its operations in the United States, Canada, and South America. COSCO later reported that the attack caused minimal disruption to its operations.

In 2018, COSCO SHIPPING Holdings acquired Hong Kong-based OOIL, the parent of OOCL, for US$6.3 billion.

In 2021, COSCO became one of the first global shipping companies to utilize the blockchain-enabled efficiency improvement application Cargo Release.

Cosco has a terminal at Abu Dhabi's new Khalifa Port. This terminal is also the first port in the middle East to have automatic port truck system.

== Fleet ==
Container ship classes of COSCO SHIPPING Lines
Ship class	Built	Capacity (TEU)	Ships in class	Notes
New Continent (Xin Da Zhou) Class	2007-2008	8,528	5	Originally built for China Shipping Container Lines
Glory-class	2011-2012	13,114	8	Long-term charter from Seaspan Corporation
Star-class	2011-2012	14,074	8	Originally built for China Shipping Container Lines
Globe class	2014-2015	18,982	5	Originally built for China Shipping Container Lines
Belgium-class	2013-2014	13,386	8	
Himalayas-class	2017-2018	14,566	5	
Peony-class	2018-2019	13,800	8	Originally built for China Shipping Container Lines
Constellation-class	2018-2019	19,237-20,119	11	
Universe-class	2018-2019	21,237	6	Originally built for China Shipping Container Lines
Brazil-class	2023–2024	14,092	6	To be built by COSCO Shipping Heavy Industry (Yangzhou)
yangpu-class	2025-2026	16,180	4	To be built by COSCO Shipping Heavy Industry (Yangzhou)
TBD	2023–2025	23,000	6	To be built by COSCO Shipping Heavy Industry (Yangzhou)
TBD	2023–2025	15,000	9	To be built by COSCO Shipping Heavy Industry (Yangzhou)
TBD	2025	16,000	4	To be built by COSCO Shipping Heavy Industry (Yangzhou)
TBD	2027	13,600	6	To be built by Hudong-Zhonghua Shipbuilding.
TBD	2027–2029	14,000	12	To be built by COSCO Shipping Heavy Industry (Yangzhou)
TBD	2027–2028	24,000	5	To be built by Dalian Cosco KHI Ship Engineering
TBD	2028-2030	1,100	5	To be built by Wuchang Shipbuilding Industry Group.
TBD	2028-2030	1,800	4	To be built by Wuchang Shipbuilding Industry Group.
TBD	2028-2030	18,000	12	To be built by Jiangnan Shipyard.

== Accidents and incidents ==
=== COSCO Asia ===
In September 2013, the container ship COSCO Asia was attacked by terrorists as it transited the Suez Canal. The attackers reportedly used machine guns and RPG launchers to fire at the ship. Egyptian security forces quelled the attack and the ship sustained only minor damage.

=== COSCO Hope ===
On March 2, 2016, the container ship COSCO Hope crashed into a gantry crane as it was leaving the Suez Canal Container Terminal in Egypt's Port Said. Several cranes collapsed or became damaged, and stacks of containers were knocked over causing a fire.

=== COSCO Shipping Leo ===
On March 29, 2018, the container ship COSCO Shipping Leo collided with the cargo ship MERCURY TRIUMPH loaded with steel in the East China Sea during sea trials. The MERCURY TRIUMPH cargo ship was seriously damaged, and the starboard of the Leo ship's bow on COSCO Shipping Leo was damaged. There were 150 people on COSCO SHIPPING LEO at the time, but there were no casualties.

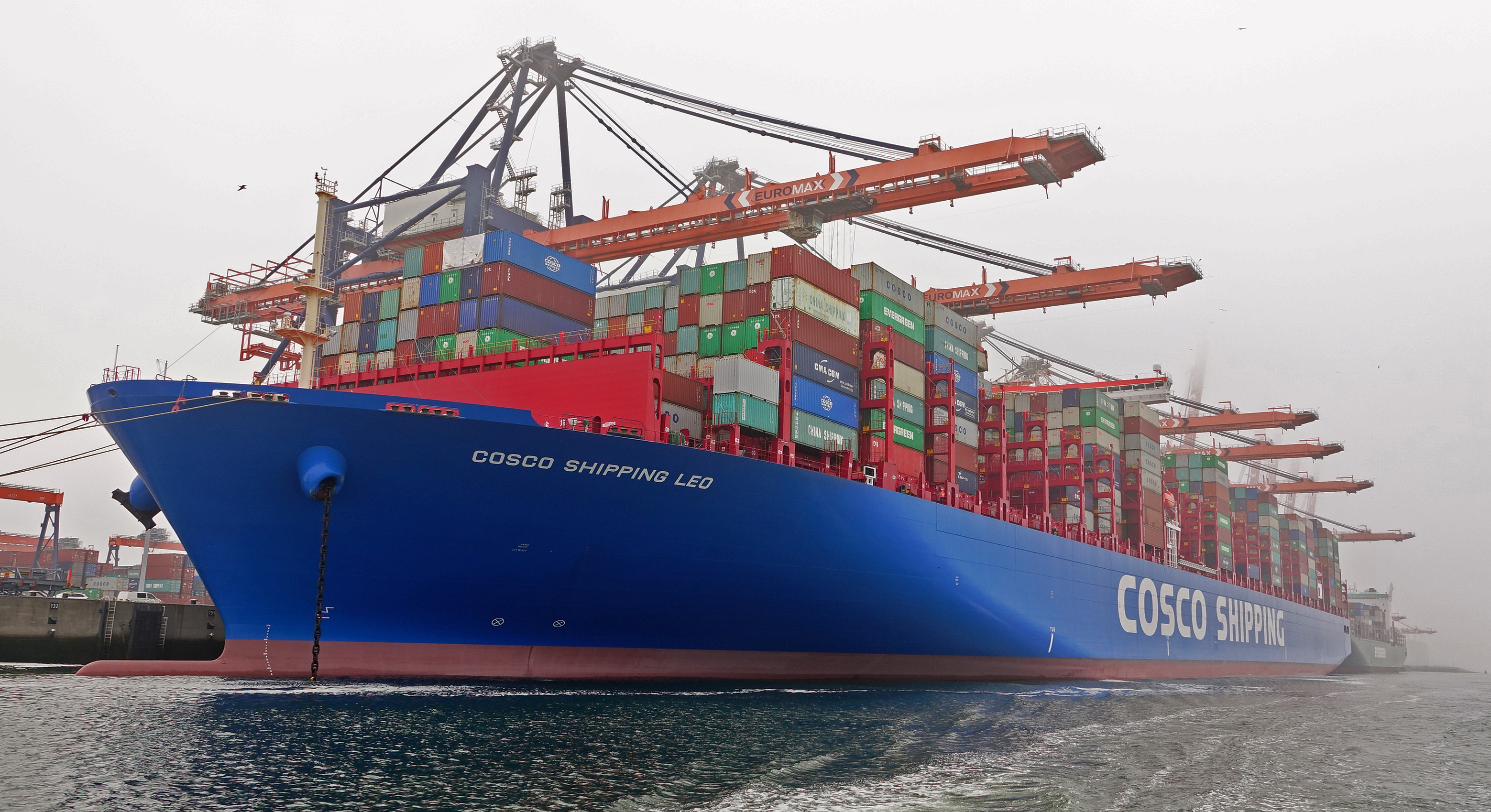
COSCO Shipping Leo in the port of Rotterdam

=== COSCO Shipping Virgo ===
On 24 December 2021, the container ship COSCO Shipping Virgo sustained propulsion loss off Portugal when on route to Rotterdam. The ship was adrift for over three hours before resuming the voyage.

== See also ==
- China and the World Trade Organization
- Containerization
- COSCO Shipping
- Economy of China
- Intermodal freight transport
- List of largest container shipping companies
- Shipping industry of China
- Transport in China
