= Constellation-class container ship =

Class of container ships

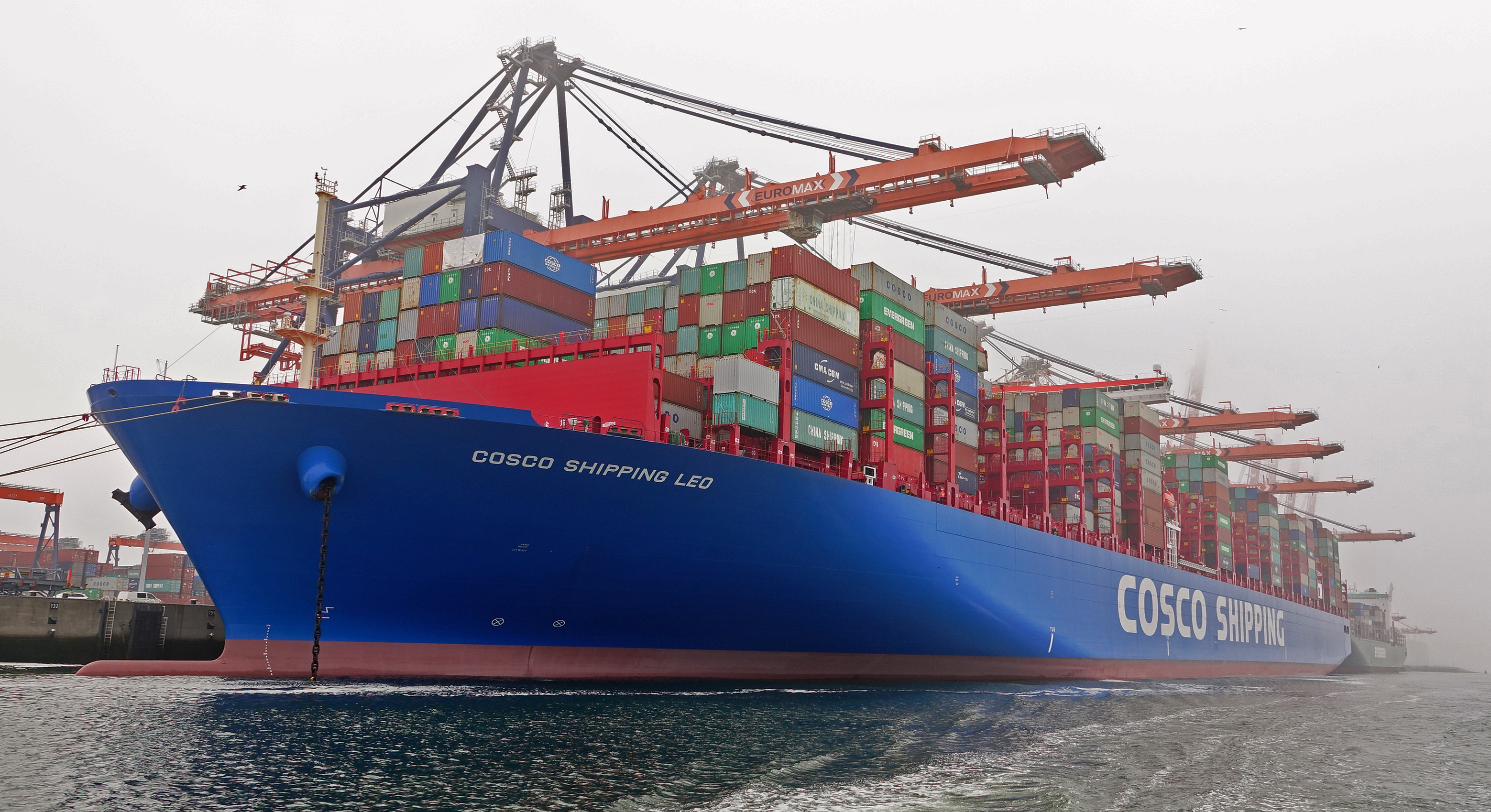
- COSCO Shipping Leo in the port of Rotterdam

Class overview
- Builders: Shanghai Waigaoqiao Shipbuilding; Dalian Shipbuilding Industry Company; Nantong Cosco KHI Ship Engineering; Dalian Cosco KHI Ship Engineering
- Operators: Cosco Shipping Lines
- In service: 2018-present
- Planned: 11
- Building: 0
- Completed: 11
- Active: 11

General characteristics (20119 TEU)
- Type: Container ship
- Tonnage: 194,864 GT
- Length: 399.8 m (1,312 ft)
- Beam: 58.7 m (193 ft)
- Draft: 16 m (52 ft)
- Capacity: 20,119 TEU

General characteristics (19273 TEU)
- Type: Container ship
- Tonnage: 192,237 GT
- Length: 400 m (1,312 ft)
- Beam: 58.6 m (192 ft)
- Draft: 16 m (52 ft)
- Capacity: 19,273 TEU

The Constellation class is a series of 11 container ships built for Cosco Shipping Lines. The maximum theoretical capacity is in the range of 19,237 to 20,119 TEU.

== List of ships ==
Ship	Yard number	IMO number	Delivery	Status	ref
Shanghai Waigaoqiao Shipbuilding (20119 TEU)
COSCO Shipping Taurus	1413	9783459	29 Jan 2018	In service	
COSCO Shipping Virgo	1414	9783461	29 May 2018	In service	
COSCO Shipping Sagittarius	1415	9783473	17 Oct 2018	In service	
Dalian Shipbuilding Industry (20119 TEU)
COSCO Shipping Gemini	C20K-1	9783526	10 Apr 2018	In service	
COSCO Shipping Libra	C20K-2	9783538	17 Jul 2018	In service	
Nantong Cosco KHI Ship Engineering (19273 TEU)
COSCO Shipping Aries	NE231	9783497	15 Jan 2018	In service	
COSCO Shipping Leo	NE232	9783502	23 Apr 2018	In service	
COSCO Shipping Capricorn	NE233	9783514	18 Jul 2018	In service	
COSCO Shipping Aquarius	NE234	9789623	5 Jun 2019	In service	
Dalian Cosco KHI Ship Engineering (19273 TEU)
COSCO Shipping Scorpio	DE040	9789635	20 Aug 2018	In service	
COSCO Shipping Pisces	DE041	9789647	15 Jan 2019	In service	

== See also ==
- Universe-class container ship
