= Universe-class container ship =

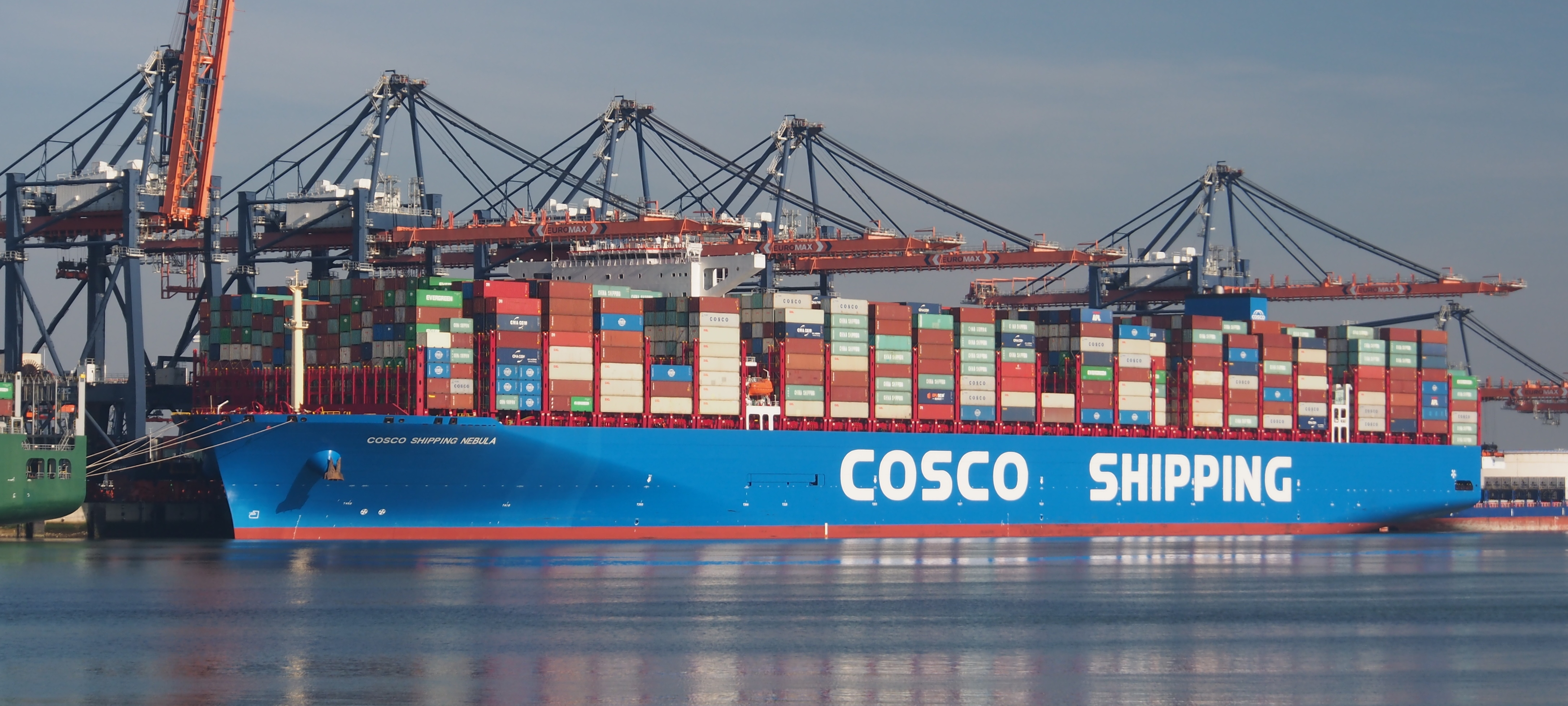
- COSCO Shipping Nebula in the port of Rotterdam

Class overview
- Builders: Shanghai Waigaoqiao Shipbuilding, Jiangnan Shipyard
- Operators: COSCO SHIPPING Lines
- In service: 2018-present
- Planned: 6
- Building: 0
- Completed: 6
- Active: 6

General characteristics
- Type: Container ship
- Tonnage: 215,553 GT
- Length: 399.9 m (1,312 ft)
- Beam: 58.6 m (192 ft)
- Draft: 16 m (52 ft)
- Capacity: 21,237 TEU

The Universe class is a series of 6 container ships built for COSCO SHIPPING Lines. The ships have a maximum theoretical capacity of 21,237 TEU. They are some of the largest container ships ever built and was the second class of ships to exceed 21,000 TEU of capacity after the OOCL G-class (21,413 TEU). At the time they were also the largest Chinese built container ships.

The ships were built by Shanghai Waigaoqiao Shipbuilding at the Jiangnan Shipyard in Shanghai. They were originally ordered for a 12 year charter by China Shipping Container Lines (CSCL). In 2016, a merger took place in which CSCL and its fleet became part of COSCO. This happened well before the ships would be finished and as a result the ships were all delivered with COSCO Shipping name and colors.

== List of ships ==
Ship	Yard number	IMO number	Delivery	Status	ref
COSCO Shipping Universe	1416	9795610	12 Jun 2018	In service	
COSCO Shipping Nebula	1417	9795622	23 Oct 2018	In service	
COSCO Shipping Galaxy	1420	9795634	18 Apr 2019	In service	
COSCO Shipping Solar	1427	9795646	25 Apr 2019	In service	
COSCO Shipping Star	1428	9795658	27 Jun 2019	In service	
COSCO Shipping Planet	1429	9795660	6 Sep 2019	In service	

== See also ==
- Constellation-class container ship
