= Container ship =

Ship that carries cargo in intermodal containers

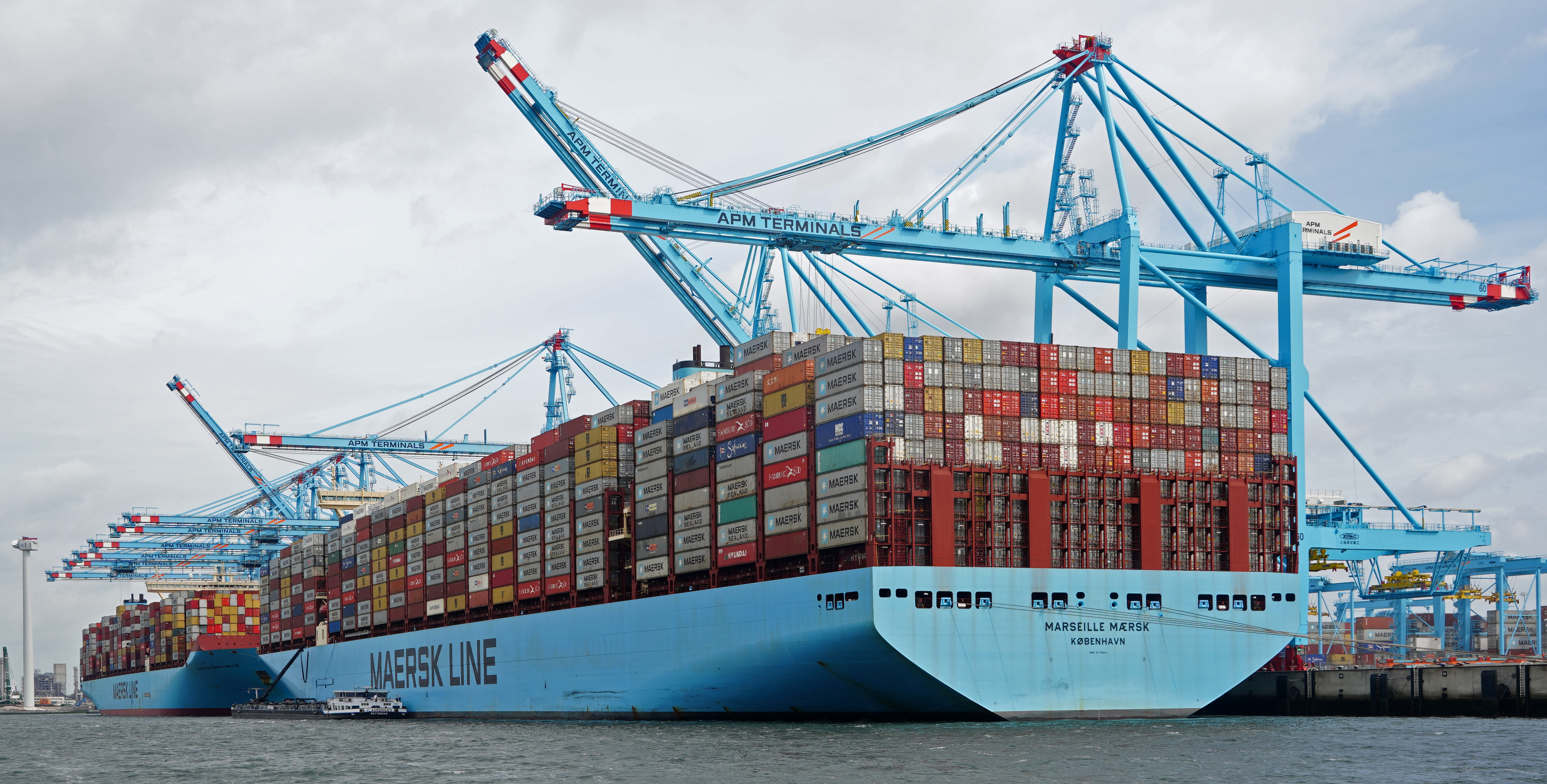
- Two Maersk Line container ships

Class overview
- Name: Container ship
- Subclasses: (1) Geared or gearless (as per cargo-handling type); (2) Freighter or pure container (as per passenger carrier-type); (3) Feeder or world-wide foreign-going vessel (as per trade); (4) Panamax or post-Panamax vessel (as per breadth of vessel < or > than 32.2m respectively)
- Built: 1956–present
- In service: 9,535 ships as of 2010

General characteristics
- Propulsion: Typically diesel since 1990
- Speed: Typically 16–25 knots (30–46 km/h) (19-29 mph)
- Capacity: Up to 24,000 TEU
- Notes: Reduced superstructure, containers stacked on deck, bulbous bow

A container ship (also called boxship or spelled containership) is a cargo ship that carries all of its load in truck-size intermodal containers, in a technique called containerization. Container ships are a common means of commercial intermodal freight transport and now carry most seagoing non-bulk cargo.

Container ship capacity is measured in twenty-foot equivalent units (TEU). Typical loads are a mix of 20-foot (1-TEU) and 40-foot (2-TEU) ISO-standard containers, with the latter predominant.

Today, about 90% of non-bulk cargo worldwide is transported by container ships, the largest of which, from 2023 onward, can carry over 24,000 TEU.

== History ==
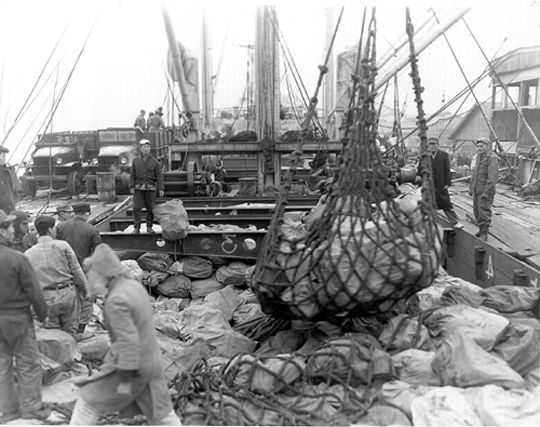
Container ships avoid the complex stevedoring of break-bulk shipping

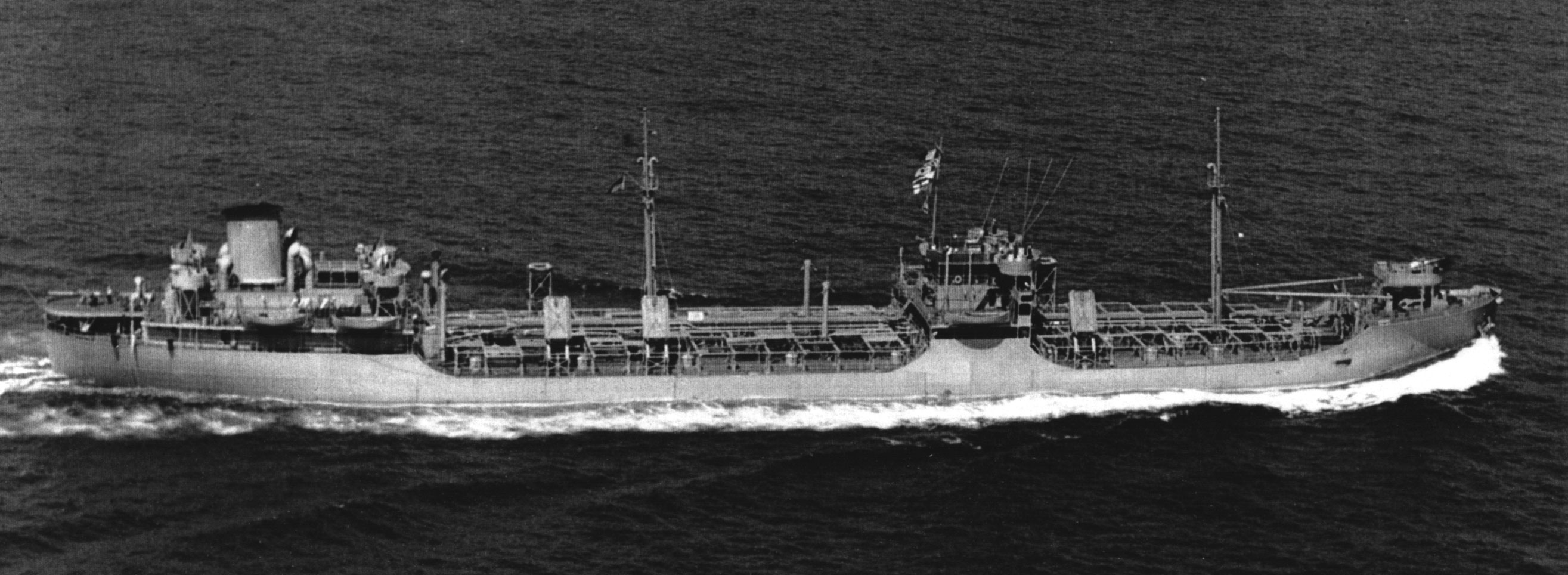
The earliest container ships were converted T2-class tankers in the 1940s after World War II

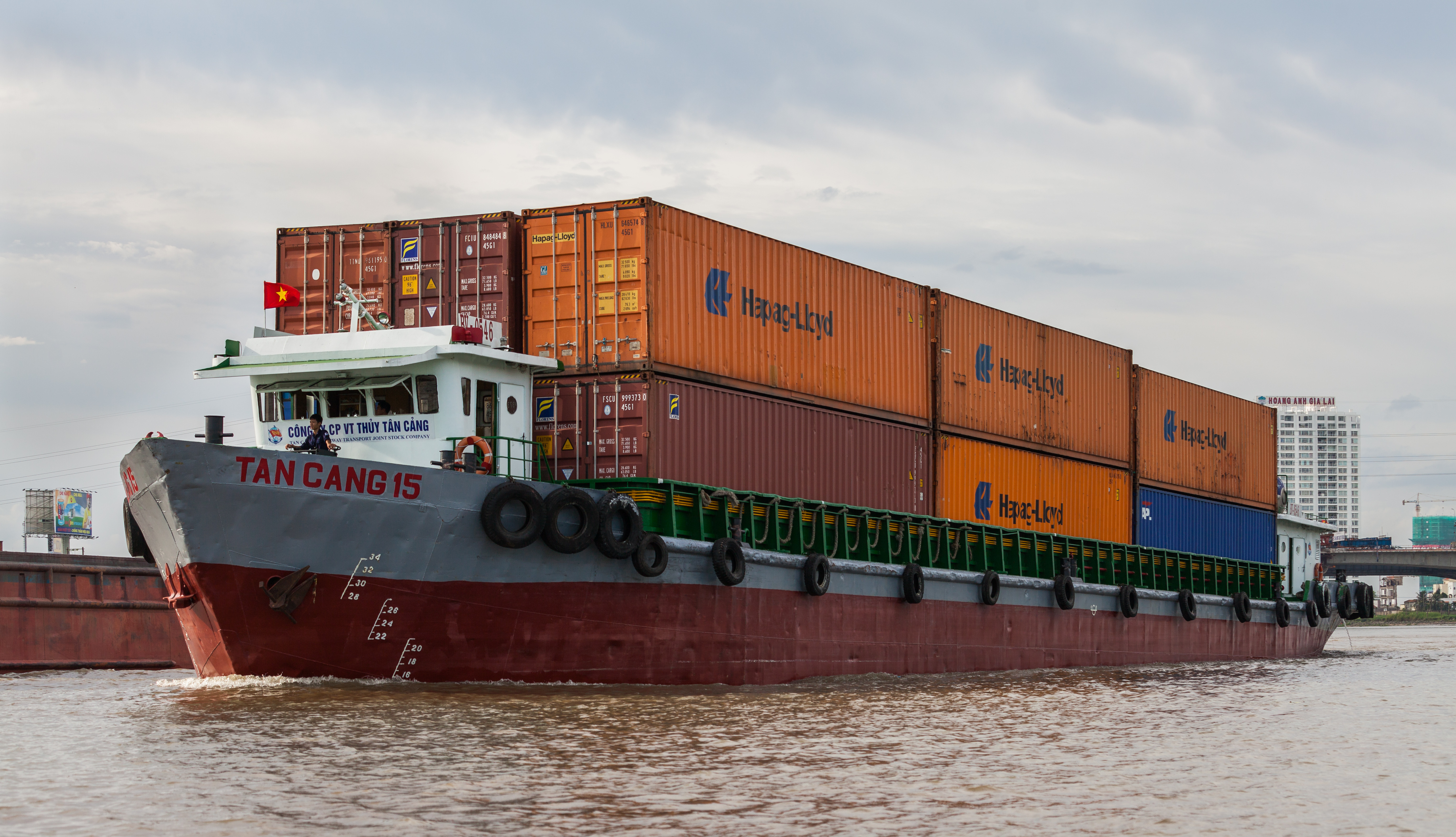
Container ship Tan Cang 15 on the Saigon River in Ho Chi Minh City, Vietnam

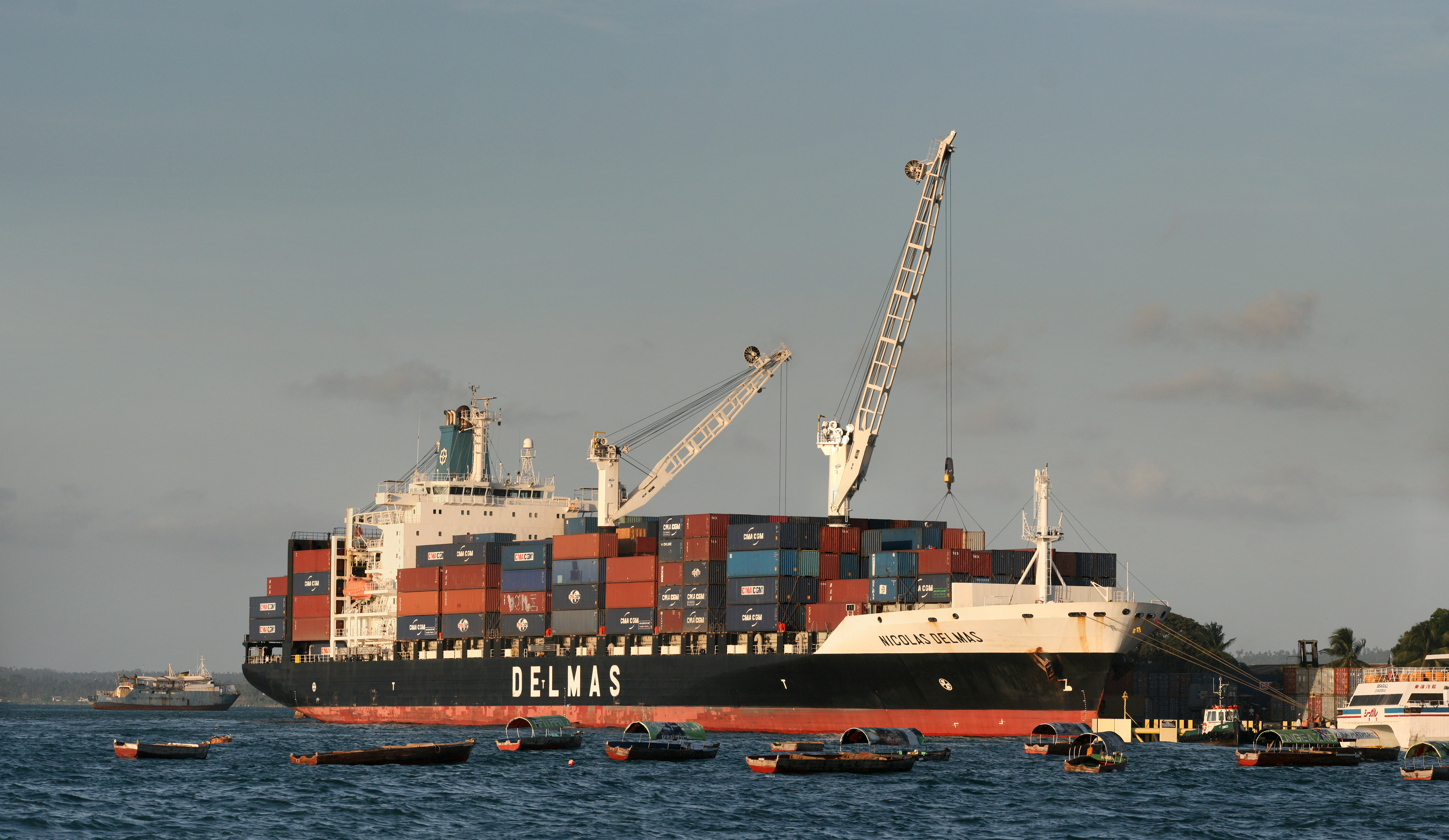
A Delmas container ship unloading at the Zanzibar port in Tanzania

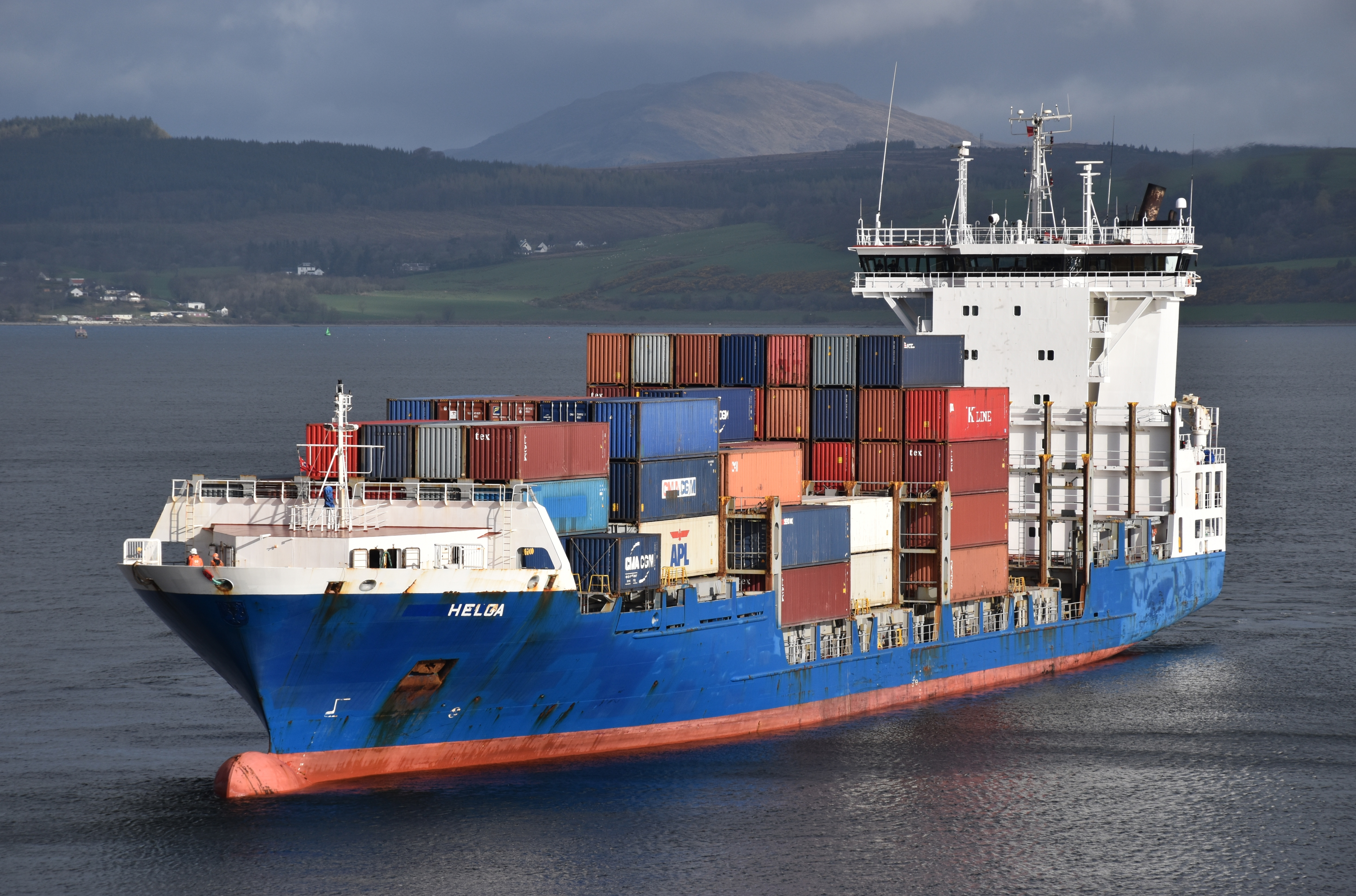
Container feeder Helga arriving at Greenock

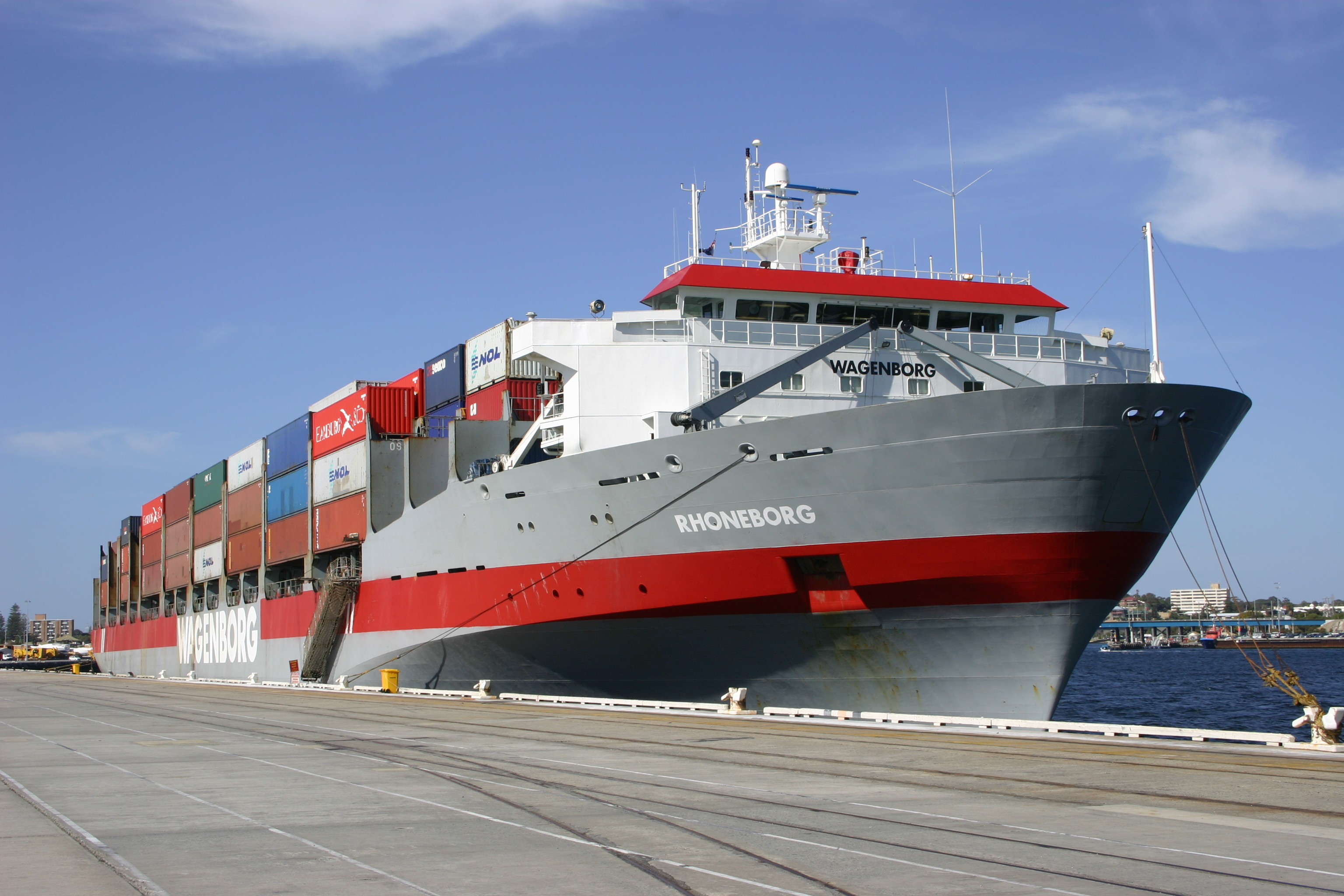
Open-top containership Rhoneborg at Fremantle

There are two main types of dry cargo: bulk cargo and break bulk cargo. Bulk cargoes, like grain or coal, are transported unpackaged in the hull of the ship, generally in large volume. Break-bulk cargoes, in contrast, are transported in packages, and are generally manufactured goods.

Before the advent of containerization in the 1950s, break-bulk items required manual loading, lashing, unlashing and unloading from the ship one piece at a time. This stevedoring process became more efficient by grouping cargo into containers, 1,000 to 3,000 cubic feet (28 to 85 m^{3}) of cargo, or up to about 64,000 pounds (29,000 kg), is moved at once and each container is secured to the ship once in a standardized way. Containerization has increased the efficiency of moving traditional break-bulk cargoes significantly, reducing shipping time by 84% and costs by 35%. In 2001, more than 90% of world trade in non-bulk goods was transported in ISO containers. In 2009, almost one quarter of the world's dry cargo was shipped by container, an estimated 125 million TEU or 1.19 billion tonnes worth of cargo.

The first ships designed to carry standardized load units were used in the late 18th century in England. In 1766 James Brindley designed the box boat "Starvationer" with 10 wooden containers, to transport coal from Worsley Delph to Manchester via the Bridgewater Canal. Before the Second World War, the first container ships were used to carry the baggage of the luxury passenger train from London to Paris (Southern Railway's Golden Arrow / La Flèche d'Or). These containers were loaded in London or Paris, and carried to ports of Dover or Calais on flat cars. In February 1931, the first container ship in the world was launched; the SS Autocarrier, owned by the Southern Railway. It had 21 slots for containers of Southern Railway.

The earliest container ships after the Second World War were converted oil tankers, built up from surplus T2 tankers after World War II. In 1951, the first purpose-built container vessels began operating in Denmark, and between Seattle and Alaska. The first commercially successful container ship was Ideal X, a T2 tanker, owned by Malcom McLean, which carried 58 metal containers between Newark, New Jersey and Houston, Texas, on its first voyage. In 1955, McLean built his company, McLean Trucking into one of the United States' biggest freighter fleets. In 1955, he purchased the small Pan Atlantic Steamship Company from Waterman Steamship and adapted its ships to carry cargo in large uniform metal containers. On April 26, 1956, the first of these rebuilt container vessels, Ideal X, left the Port Newark in New Jersey and a new revolution in modern shipping resulted.

In the 1950s, a new standardized steel Intermodal container based on specifications from the United States Department of Defense began to revolutionize freight transportation (especially for shipping companies like Seatrain Lines).

The White Pass & Yukon Route railway acquired the world's first purpose-built container ship, the Clifford J. Rogers, built in 1955, and introduced containers to its railway in 1956.

MV Kooringa was the world's first fully cellular, purpose-built container ship. and was built by Australian company Associated Steamships, a partnership formed by the 1964 merger of the Adelaide Steamship Company with McIlwraith, McEacharn & Co, then commissioned in May 1964.

Container ships were designed to accommodate intermodal transport of goods, and eliminated requirements for the individual hatches, holds and other dividers of traditional cargo ships. The hull of a typical container ship is similar to an airport hangar, or a huge warehouse, which is divided into individual holding cells, using vertical guide rails. The ship's cells are designed to hold cargo containers, which are typically constructed of steel, though sometimes of aluminum, fiberglass or plywood, and designed for intermodal transfers between ship and train, truck or semi-trailer. Shipping containers are categorized by type, size and function.

Today, about 90% of non-bulk cargo worldwide is transported by container by about 50,000 container ships. Modern container ships can carry over 24,000 TEU. The largest container ships measure about 400 metres (1,300 ft) in length, and carry loads equal to the cargo-carrying capacity of sixteen to seventeen pre-World War II freighter ships.

== Architecture ==
There are several key points in the design of modern container ships. The hull, similar to that of bulk carriers and general cargo ships, is built around a strong keel. Into this frame is set one or more below-deck cargo holds, numerous tanks, and the engine room. The holds are topped by hatch covers, onto which more containers can be stacked. Many container ships have cargo cranes installed on them, and some have specialized systems for securing containers on board.

The hull of a modern cargo ship is a complex arrangement of steel plates and strengthening beams. Resembling ribs, and fastened at right angles to the keel, are the ship's frames. The ship's main deck, the metal platework that covers the top of the hull framework, is supported by beams that are attached to the tops of the frames and run the full breadth of the ship. The beams not only support the deck, but along with the deck, frames, and transverse bulkheads, strengthen and reinforce the shell. Another feature of recent hulls is a set of double-bottom tanks, which provide a second watertight shell that runs most of the length of a ship. The double-bottoms generally hold liquids such as fuel oil, ballast water or fresh water.

A ship's engine room houses its main engines and auxiliary machinery such as the fresh water and sewage systems, electrical generators, fire pumps, and air conditioners. In most new ships, the engine room is located in the aft portion.

=== Size categories ===
The size of the MV Dali, involved in the 2024 Francis Scott Key Bridge collapse, though considered large, is less than that of the largest container ship. It is recognized that bigger ships can cause bigger disasters, such as the 1,300-foot vessel in the 2021 Suez Canal obstruction.

Container ships are distinguished into 7 major size categories: small feeder, feeder, feedermax, Panamax, Post-Panamax, Neopanamax and ultra-large. As of December 2012, there were 161 container ships in the VLCS class (Very Large Container Ships, more than 10,000 TEU), and 51 ports in the world can accommodate them.

The size of a Panamax vessel is limited by the original Panama canal's lock chambers, which can accommodate ships with a beam of up to 32.31 m, a length overall of up to 294.13 m, and a draft of up to 12.04 m. The Post-Panamax category has historically been used to describe ships with a moulded breadth over 32.31 m, however the Panama Canal expansion project has caused some changes in terminology. The Neopanamax category is based on the maximum vessel size that is able to transit a new third set of locks, which opened in June 2016. The third set of locks were built to accommodate a container ship with a length overall of 366 metres (1,201 ft), a maximum beam (width) of 49 metres (161 ft), and tropical fresh-water draft of 15.2 metres (50 ft). Such a vessel, called Neopanamax class, is wide enough to carry 19 columns of containers, can have a total capacity of approximately 12,000 TEU and is comparable in size to a capesize bulk carrier or a Suezmax tanker.

Container ships under 3,000 TEU are generally called feeder ships or feeders. They are small ships that typically operate between smaller container ports. Some feeders collect their cargo from small ports, drop it off at large ports for transshipment on larger ships, and distribute containers from the large port to smaller regional ports. This size of vessel is the most likely to carry cargo cranes on board.

Container ship size categories
Name	Capacity (TEU)	Length	Beam	Draft	Example
Ultra Large Container Vessel (ULCV)	14,501 and higher	1,200 ft (366 m) and longer	160.7 ft (49 m) and wider	49.9 ft (15.2 m) and deeper	With a length of 400 m, a beam of 59 m, draft of 14.5 m, and a capacity of 18,270 TEU, ships of the Maersk Triple E class are able to transit the Suez canal. Photo: MV Mærsk Mc-Kinney Møller
New Panamax (or Neopanamax)	10,000–14,500	1,200 ft (366 m)	160.7 ft (49 m)	49.9 ft (15.2 m)	With a beam of 43 m, ships of the COSCO Guangzhou class are much too big to fit through the Panama Canal's old locks, but could easily fit through the new expansion. Photo: The 9,500 TEU MV COSCO Guangzhou pierside in Hamburg
Post-Panamax	5,101–10,000	1,200 ft (366 m)	160.7 ft (49 m)	49.9 ft (15.2 m)	With a beam of 43 m, ships of the COSCO Guangzhou class are much too big to fit through the Panama Canal's old locks, but could easily fit through the new expansion. Photo: The 9,500 TEU MV COSCO Guangzhou pierside in Hamburg
Panamax	3,001–5,100	965 ft (294.13 m)	106 ft (32.31 m)	39.5 ft (12.04 m)	Ships of the Bay class are at the upper limit of the Panamax class, with an overall length of 292.15 m, beam of 32.2m, and maximum depth of 13.3 m. Photo: The 4,224 TEU MV Providence Bay passing through the Panama Canal
Feedermax	2,001–3,000				Container ships under 3,000 TEU are typically called feeders. In some areas of the world, they might be outfitted with cargo cranes. Photo: The 384 TEU MV TransAtlantic at anchor
Feeder	1,001–2,000				Container ships under 3,000 TEU are typically called feeders. In some areas of the world, they might be outfitted with cargo cranes. Photo: The 384 TEU MV TransAtlantic at anchor
Small feeder	Up to 1,000				Container ships under 3,000 TEU are typically called feeders. In some areas of the world, they might be outfitted with cargo cranes. Photo: The 384 TEU MV TransAtlantic at anchor

=== Cargo cranes ===
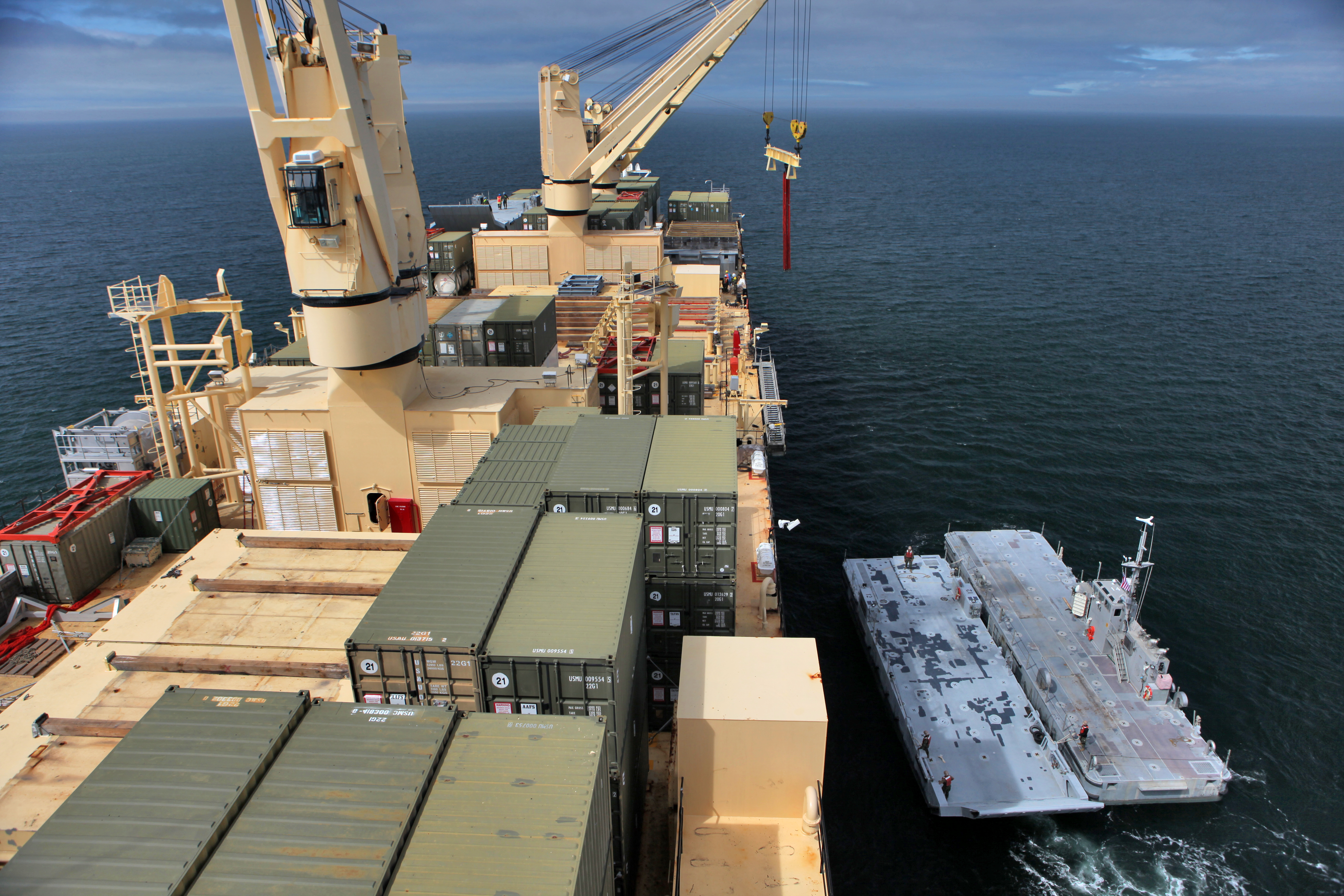
Cargo cranes on a US navy container ship

A major characteristic of a container ship is whether it has cranes installed for handling its cargo. Those that have cargo cranes are called geared and those that do not are called ungeared or gearless. The earliest purpose-built container ships in the 1970s were all gearless. Since then, the percentage of geared newbuilds has fluctuated widely, but has been decreasing overall, with only 7.5% of the container ship capacity in 2009 being equipped with cranes.

While geared container ships are more flexible in that they can visit ports that are not equipped with pierside container cranes, they suffer from several drawbacks. To begin with, geared ships will cost more to purchase than a gearless ship. Geared ships also incur greater recurring expenses, such as maintenance and fuel costs. The United Nations Council on Trade and Development characterizes geared ships as a "niche market only appropriate for those ports where low cargo volumes do not justify investment in port cranes or where the public sector does not have the financial resources for such investment".

Instead of the rotary cranes, some geared ships have gantry cranes installed. These cranes, specialized for container work, are able to roll forward and aft on rails. In addition to the additional capital expense and maintenance costs, these cranes generally load and discharge containers much more slowly than their shoreside counterparts.

The introduction and improvement of shoreside container cranes have been a key to the success of the container ship. The first crane that was specifically designed for container work was built in California's Port of Alameda in 1959. By the 1980s, shoreside gantry cranes were capable of moving containers on a 3-minute-cycle, or up to 400 tons per hour. In March 2010, at Port Klang in Malaysia, a new world record was set when 734 container moves were made in a single hour. The record was achieved using 9 cranes to simultaneously load and unload MV CSCL Pusan, a ship with a capacity of 9,600 TEU.

Vessels in the 1,500–2,499 TEU range are the most likely size class to have cranes, with more than 60% of this category being geared ships. Slightly less than a third of the very smallest ships (from 100 to 499 TEU) are geared, and almost no ships with a capacity of over 4,000 TEU are geared.

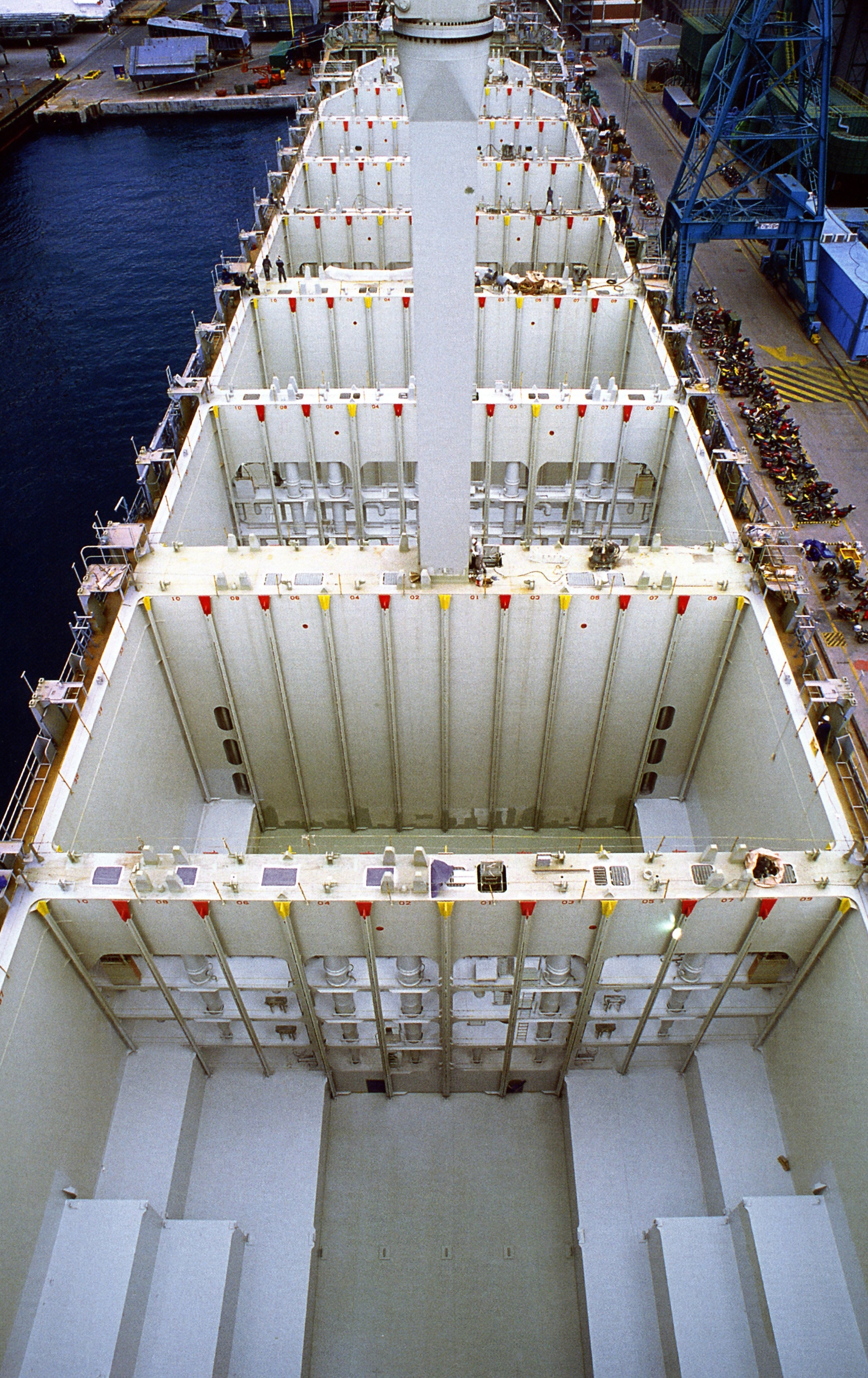
A view into the holds of a container ship. The vertical cell guides organize containers athwartships.

=== Cargo holds ===
Efficiency has always been key in the design of container ships. While containers may be carried on conventional break-bulk ships, cargo holds for dedicated container ships are specially constructed to speed loading and unloading, and to efficiently keep containers secure while at sea. A key aspect of container ship specialization is the design of the hatches, the openings from the main deck to the cargo holds. The hatch openings stretch the entire breadth of the cargo holds, and are surrounded by a raised steel structure known as the hatch coaming. On top of the hatch coamings are the hatch covers. Until the 1950s, hatches were typically secured with wooden boards and tarpaulins held down with battens. Today, some hatch covers can be solid metal plates that are lifted on and off the ship by cranes, while others are articulated mechanisms that are opened and closed using powerful hydraulic rams.

Another key component of dedicated container-ship design is the use of cell guides. Cell guides are strong vertical structures constructed of metal installed into a ship's cargo holds. These structures guide containers into well-defined rows during loading and provide some support for containers against the ship's rolling at sea. So fundamental to container ship design are cell guides that organizations such as the United Nations Conference on Trade and Development use their presence to distinguish dedicated container ships from general break-bulk cargo ships.

A system of three dimensions is used in cargo plans to describe the position of a container aboard the ship. The first coordinate is the bay, which starts at the front of the ship and increases aft. The second coordinate is the row. Rows on the starboard side are given odd numbers and those on the port side are given even numbers. The rows nearest the centerline are given low numbers, and the numbers increase for slots further from the centerline. The third coordinate is the tier, with the first tier at the bottom of the cargo holds, the second tier on top of that, and so forth.

Container ships typically take 20 foot and 40 foot containers. Some ships can take 45 footers above deck. A few ships (APL since 2007, Carrier53 since 2022) can carry 53 foot containers. 40 foot containers are the primary container size, making up about 90% of all container shipping and since container shipping moves 90% of the world's freight, over 80% of the world's freight moves via 40 foot containers.

=== Lashing systems ===
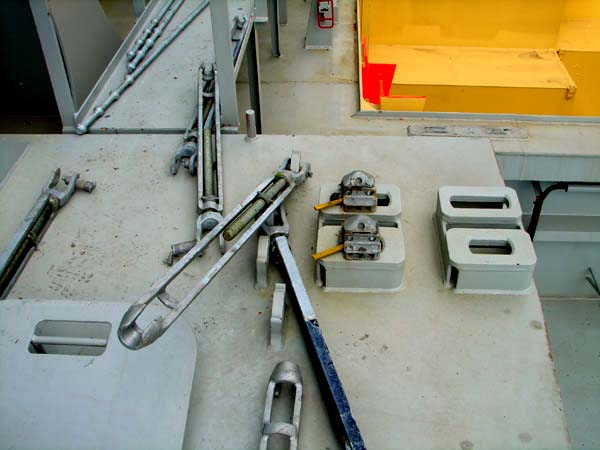
Twist-locks and lashing rods (pictured) are widely used to secure containers aboard ships.

Numerous systems are used to secure containers aboard ships, depending on factors such as the type of ship, the type of container, and the location of the container. Storage inside the holds of fully cellular (FC) ships is simplest, typically using simple metal forms called container guides, locating cones, and anti-rack spacers to lock the containers together. Above-decks, without the extra support of the cell guides, more complicated equipment is used. Three types of systems are currently in wide use: lashing systems, locking systems, and buttress systems. Lashing systems secure containers to the ship using devices made from wire rope, rigid rods, or chains and devices to tension the lashings, such as turnbuckles. The effectiveness of lashings is increased by securing containers to each other, either by simple metal forms (such as stacking cones) or more complicated devices such as twist-lock stackers. A typical twist-lock is inserted into the casting hole of one container and rotated to hold it in place, then another container is lowered on top of it. The two containers are locked together by twisting the device's handle. A typical twist-lock is constructed of forged steel and ductile iron and has a shear strength of 48 tonnes.

The buttress system, used on some large container ships, uses a system of large towers attached to the ship at both ends of each cargo hold. As the ship is loaded, a rigid, removable stacking frame is added, structurally securing each tier of containers together.

=== Bridge ===
Container ships have typically had a single bridge and accommodation unit towards the rear, but to reconcile demand for larger container capacity with SOLAS visibility requirements, several new designs have been developed. As of 2015, some large container ships are being developed with the bridge further forward, separate from the exhaust stack. Some smaller container ships working in European ports and rivers have liftable wheelhouses, which can be lowered to pass under low bridges.

== Fleet characteristics ==
Largest container ship operators, 2022
1. MSC – Switzerland / Italy
2. Maersk Line – Denmark
3. CMA CGM – France
4. COSCO – China
5. Hapag-Lloyd – Germany
6. Evergreen – Taiwan
7. ONE – Japan
8. HMM – South Korea
9. Yang Ming – Taiwan
10. ZIM – Israel

Fleet capacity, April 02, 2023
fleet	TEU
MSC	4832709
Maersk	4185693
CMA CGM	3409776
COSCO	2886908
Hapag-Lloyd	1798866
Evergreen	1668555
ONE	1534426
HMM	816365
Yang Ming	705614
ZIM	566935

Worldwide capacity
year	million TEU
1990	1.5
2000	4.3
2008	10.6
2012	15.4
2017	20.3

As of 2010, container ships made up 13.3% of the world's fleet in terms of deadweight tonnage. The world's total of container ship deadweight tonnage has increased from 11 million DWT in 1980 to 169.0 million DWT in 2010. The combined deadweight tonnage of container ships and general cargo ships, which also often carry containers, represents 21.8% of the world's fleet.

As of 2009, the average age of container ships worldwide was 10.6 years, making them the youngest general vessel type, followed by bulk carriers at 16.6 years, oil tankers at 17 years, general cargo ships at 24.6 years, and others at 25.3 years.

Most of the world's carrying capacity in fully cellular container ships is in the liner service, where ships trade on scheduled routes. As of January 2010, the top 20 liner companies controlled 67.5% of the world's fully cellular container capacity, with 2,673 vessels of an average capacity of 3,774 TEU. The remaining 6,862 fully cellular ships have an average capacity of 709 TEU each.

The vast majority of the capacity of fully cellular container ships used in the liner trade is owned by German shipowners, with approximately 75% owned by Hamburg brokers. It is a common practice for the large container lines to supplement their own ships with chartered-in ships, for example in 2009, 48.9% of the tonnage of the top 20 liner companies was chartered-in in this manner.

=== Flag states ===
International law requires that every merchant ship be registered in a country, called its flag state. A ship's flag state exercises regulatory control over the vessel and is required to inspect it regularly, certify the ship's equipment and crew, and issue safety and pollution prevention documents. As of 2006, the United States Bureau of Transportation Statistics count 2,837 container ships of 10,000 long tons deadweight (DWT) or greater worldwide. Panama was the world's largest flag state for container ships, with 541 of the vessels in its registry. Seven other flag states had more than 100 registered container ships: Liberia (415), Germany (248), Singapore (177), Cyprus (139), the Marshall Islands (118) and the United Kingdom (104). The Panamanian, Liberian, and Marshallese flags are open registries and considered by the International Transport Workers' Federation to be flags of convenience. By way of comparison, traditional maritime nations such as the United States and Japan only had 75 and 11 registered container ships, respectively.

=== Vessel purchases ===

In recent years, oversupply of container ship capacity has caused prices for new and used ships to fall. From 2008 to 2009, new container ship prices dropped by 19–33%, while prices for 10-year-old container ships dropped by 47–69%. In March 2010, the average price for a geared 500-TEU container ship was $10 million, while gearless ships of 6,500 and 12,000 TEU averaged prices of $74 million and $105 million respectively. At the same time, secondhand prices for 10-year-old geared container ships of 500-, 2,500-, and 3,500-TEU capacity averaged prices of $4 million, $15 million, and $18 million respectively.

In 2009, 11,669,000 gross tons of newly built container ships were delivered. Over 85% of this new capacity was built in the Republic of Korea, China, and Japan, with Korea accounting for over 57% of the world's total alone. New container ships accounted for 15% of the total new tonnage that year, behind bulk carriers at 28.9% and oil tankers at 22.6%.

=== Scrapping ===
Most ships are removed from the fleet through a process known as scrapping. Scrapping is rare for ships under 18 years old and common for those over 40 years in age. Ship-owners and buyers negotiate scrap prices based on factors such as the ship's empty weight (called light ton displacement or LTD) and prices in the scrap metal market. Scrapping rates are volatile, the price per light ton displacement has swung from a high of $650 per LTD in mid-2008 to $200 per LTD in early 2009, before building to $400 per LTD in March 2010. As of 2009, over 96% of the world's scrapping activity takes place in China, India, Bangladesh, and Pakistan.

The global economic downturn of 2008–2009 resulted in more ships than usual being sold for scrap. In 2009, 364,300 TEU worth of container ship capacity was scrapped, up from 99,900 TEU in 2008. Container ships accounted for 22.6% of the total gross tonnage of ships scrapped that year. Despite the surge, the capacity removed from the fleet only accounted for 3% of the world's container ship capacity. The average age of container ships scrapped in 2009 was 27.0 years.

=== Largest ships ===
15 largest container ship classes, listed by TEU capacity
Built	Name	Class size	Maximum TEU	Sources
2023	MSC Irina	6	24,346	
2023	OOCL Spain	8	24,188	
2023	ONE Innovation	6	24,136	
2023	MSC Tessa	8	24,116	
2021	Ever Ace	6	23,992	
2020	HMM Algeciras	7	23,964	
2020	HMM Oslo	5	23,792	
2019	MSC Gülsün	6	23,756	
2019	MSC Mina	10	23,656	
2020	CMA CGM Jacques Saadé	9	23,112	
2017	OOCL Hong Kong	6	21,413	
2018	COSCO Shipping Universe	6	21,237	
2018	CMA CGM Antoine de Saint Exupery	3	20,954	
2017	Madrid Mærsk	11	20,568	
2017	MOL Truth	2	20,182	
2017	MOL Triumph	4	20,170	
2019	Ever Glory	4	20,160	
2018	Ever Goods	7	20,124	
2018	COSCO Shipping Taurus	5	20,119	

Economies of scale have dictated an upward trend in the size of container ships in order to reduce expenses. However, there are certain limitations to the size of container ships. Primarily, these are the availability of sufficiently large main engines and the availability of a sufficient number of ports and terminals prepared and equipped to handle ultra-large container ships. Furthermore, the permissible maximum ship dimensions in some of the world's main waterways could present an upper limit in terms of vessel growth. This primarily concerns the Suez Canal and the Singapore Strait.

In 2008 the South Korean shipbuilder STX announced plans to construct a container ship capable of carrying 22,000 TEU, and with a proposed length of 450 m (1,480 ft) and a beam of 60 m (200 ft). If constructed, the container ship would become the largest seagoing vessel in the world.

Since even very large container ships are vessels with relatively low draft compared to large tankers and bulk carriers, there is still considerable room for vessel growth. Compared to today's largest container ships, Maersk Line's 15,200 TEU Emma Mærsk-type series, a 20,000 TEU container ship would only be moderately larger in terms of exterior dimensions. According to a 2011 estimate, an ultra-large container ship of 20,250 TEU would measure 440 m × 59 m (1,444 ft × 194 ft), compared to 397.71 m × 56.40 m (1,304.8 ft × 185.0 ft) for the Emma Mærsk class. It would have an estimated deadweight of circa 220,000 tons. While such a vessel might be near the upper limit for a Suez Canal passage, the so-called Malaccamax concept (for Straits of Malacca) does not apply for container ships, since the Malacca and Singapore Straits' draft limit of about 21 metres (69 ft) is still above that of any conceivable container ship design. In 2011, Maersk announced plans to build a new "Triple E" family of container ships with a capacity of 18,000 TEU, with an emphasis on lower fuel consumption.

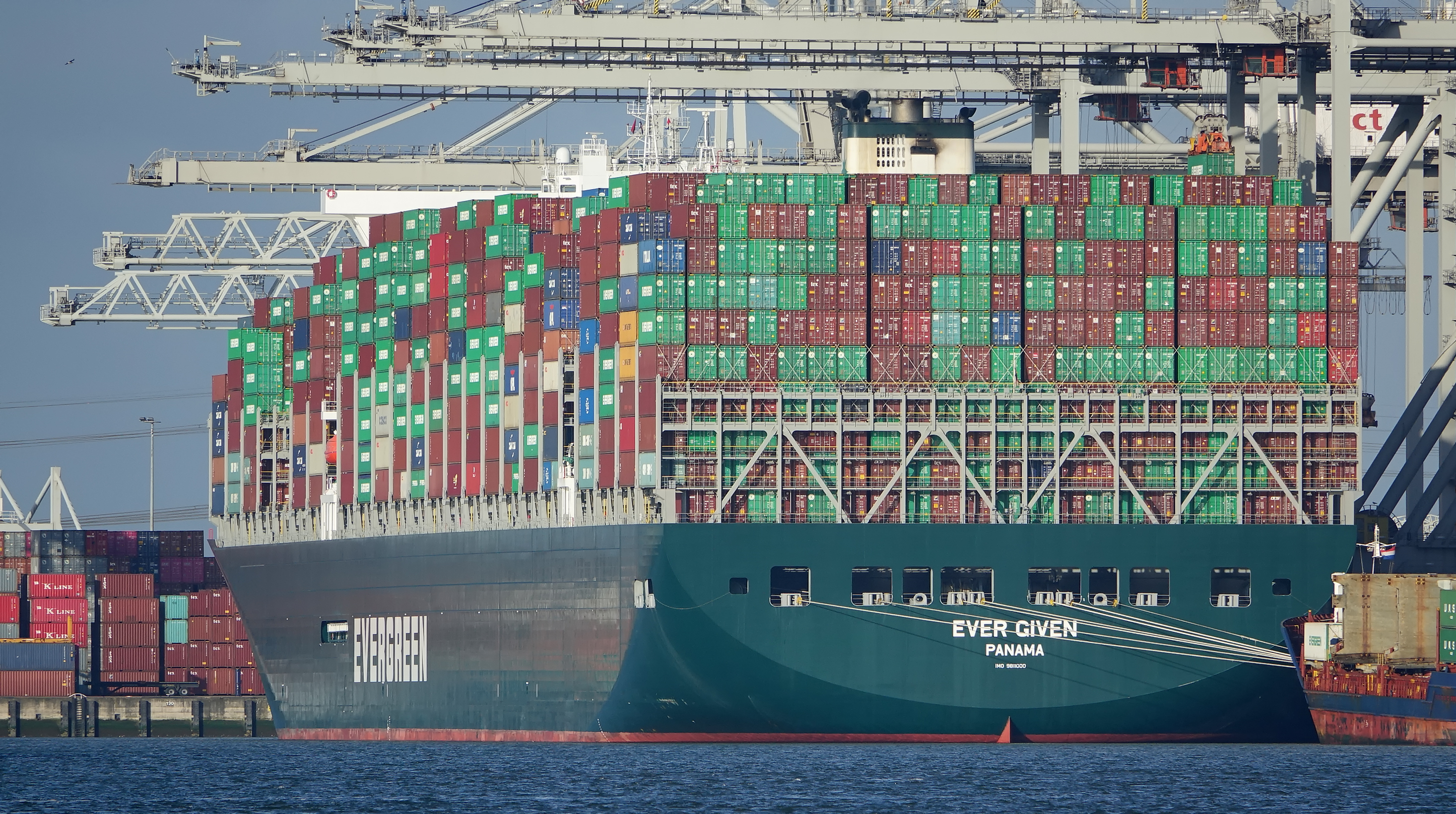
Ever Given in March 2020 at the ECT Delta terminal in the Port of Rotterdam

In the present market situation, main engines will not be as much of a limiting factor for vessel growth either. The steadily rising expense of fuel oil in the early 2010s had prompted most container lines to adapt a slower, more economical voyage speed of about 21 knots, compared to earlier top speeds of 25 or more knots. Subsequently, newly built container ships can be fitted with a smaller main engine. Engine types fitted to today's ships of 14,000 TEU are thus sufficiently large to propel future vessels of 20,000 TEU or more. Maersk Line, the world's largest container shipping line, nevertheless opted for twin engines (two smaller engines working two separate propellers), when ordering a series of ten 18,000 TEU vessels from Daewoo Shipbuilding in February 2011. The ships were delivered between 2013 and 2014. In 2016, some experts believed that the current largest container ships are at the optimum size, and could not economically be larger, as port facilities would be too expensive, port handling too time-consuming, the number of suitable ports too low, and insurance cost too high.

In March 2017 the first ship with an official capacity over 20,000 TEUs was christened at Samsung Heavy Industries. MOL Triumph has a capacity of 20,150 TEUs. Samsung Heavy Industries was expected to deliver several ships of over 20,000 TEUs in 2017, and has orders for at least ten vessels in that size range for OOCL and MOL.

The world's largest container ship, MSC Irina, was delivered March 9, 2023 by builder Yangzi Xinfu Shipbuilding to the Mediterranean Shipping Company (MSC), with a capacity of 24,346 TEUs. Measuring 399.99 metres in length and 61.3 metres in beam, the ship is one of four ordered from the builder in 2020, and exceeded MSC's 24,116 TEU MSC Tessa, which had been delivered that same day by the China State Shipbuilding Corporation (CSSC). In April, MSC Irina sister ship MSC Loreto, with an equal capacity of 24,346 TEU was received by MSC.

On June 2, 2023 Ocean Network Express took delivery of the ONE Innovation with a capacity of 24,136 TEUs. ONE Innovation is one of six new Megamax vessels ordered by Ocean Network Express in December 2020 to be built by a consortium of Imabari Shipbuilding and Japan Marine United.

=== Freight market ===
The act of hiring a ship to carry cargo is called chartering. Outside special bulk cargo markets, ships are hired by three types of charter agreements: the voyage charter, the time charter, and the bareboat charter. In a voyage charter, the charterer rents the vessel from the loading port to the discharge port. In a time charter, the vessel is hired for a set period of time, to perform voyages as the charterer directs. In a bareboat charter, the charterer acts as the ship's operator and manager, taking on responsibilities such as providing the crew and maintaining the vessel. The completed chartering contract is known as a charter party.

The United Nations Conference on Trade and Development [UNCTAD], tracks in its 2010 Review of Maritime Trade two aspects of container shipping prices: The first one is a chartering price, specifically the price to time-charter a 1 TEU slot for 14 tonnes of cargo on a container ship. The other is the freight rate; or comprehensive daily cost to deliver one-TEU worth of cargo on a given route. As a result of the late-2000s recession, both indicators showed sharp drops during 2008–2009, and have shown signs of stabilization since 2010.

UNCTAD uses the Hamburg Shipbrokers' Association (formally the Vereinigung Hamburger Schiffsmakler und Schiffsagenten e. V. or VHSS for short) as its main industry source for container ship freight prices. The VHSS maintains a few indices of container ship charter prices. The oldest, which dates back to 1998, is called the Hamburg Index. This index considers time-charters on fully cellular container ships controlled by Hamburg brokers. It is limited to charters of 3 months or more, and presented as the average daily cost in U.S. dollars for a one-TEU slot with a weight of 14 tonnes. The Hamburg Index data is divided into ten categories based primarily on vessel carrying capacity. Two additional categories exist for small vessels of under 500 TEU that carry their own cargo cranes. In 2007, VHSS started another index, the New ConTex which tracks similar data obtained from an international group of shipbrokers.

The Hamburg Index shows some clear trends in recent chartering markets. First, rates were generally increasing from 2000 to 2005. From 2005 to 2008, rates slowly decreased, and in mid-2008 began a "dramatic decline" of approximately 75%, which lasted until rates stabilized in April 2009. Rates have ranged from $2.70 to $35.40 in this period, with prices generally lower on larger ships. The most resilient sized vessel in this time period were those from 200 to 300 TEU, a fact that the United Nations Council on Trade and Development attributes to lack of competition in this sector. Overall, in 2010, these rates rebounded somewhat, but remained at approximately half of their 2008 values. As of 2011, the index shows signs of recovery for container shipping, and combined with increases in global capacity, indicates a positive outlook for the sector in the near future.

2008–2009 freight rates in 1000 US$/TEU
From	To	2008				2009			
From	To	Q1	Q2	Q3	Q4	Q1	Q2	Q3	Q4
Asia	U.S.	1.8	1.8	1.9	1.9	1.7	1.4	1.2	1.3
U.S.	Asia	0.8	1.0	1.2	1.2	0.9	0.8	0.8	0.9
Europe	Asia	1.0	1.1	1.1	1.1	0.9	0.7	0.8	0.9
Asia	Europe	2.0	1.9	1.8	1.6	1.0	0.9	1.0	1.4
U.S.	Europe	1.3	1.4	1.6	1.7	1.5	1.4	1.4	1.5
Europe	U.S.	1.6	1.6	1.6	1.6	1.3	1.2	1.1	1.3

Year-average daily charter rates for a 1-TEU (14-tonne) slot have varied from $2.70 to $35.40 between 2000 and 2010.

UNCTAD also tracks container freight rates. Freight rates are expressed as the total price in U.S. dollars for a shipper to transport one TEU worth of cargo along a given route. Data is given for the three main container liner routes: U.S.-Asia, U.S.-Europe, and Europe-Asia. Prices are typically different between the two legs of a voyage, for example the Asia-U.S. rates have been significantly higher than the return U.S.-Asia rates in recent years. Generally, from the fourth quarter of 2008 through the third quarter of 2009, both the volume of container cargo and freight rates have dropped sharply. In 2009, the freight rates on the U.S.–Europe route were sturdiest, while the Asia-U.S. route fell the most.

Container freight markets and rates
$ per TEU from Shanghai to	2009	2010	2011	2012	2013	2014
United States West Coast	1372	2308	1667	2287	2033	1970
United States East Coast	2367	3499	3008	3416	3290	3720
Northern Europe	1395	1789	881	1353	1084	1161
Mediterranean	1397	1739	973	1336	1151	1253
South America (Santos)	2429	2236	1483	1771	1380	1103
South Africa (Durban)	1495	1481	991	1047	805	760
Singapore		318	210	256	231	233
East Japan		316	337	345	346	273

Liner companies responded to their overcapacity in several ways. For example, in early 2009, some container lines dropped their freight rates to zero on the Asia-Europe route, charging shippers only a surcharge to cover operating costs. They decreased their overcapacity by lowering the ships' speed (a strategy called "slow steaming") and by laying up ships. Slow steaming increased the length of the Europe-Asia routes to a record high of over 40 days. Another strategy used by some companies was to manipulate the market by publishing notices of rate increases in the press, and when "a notice had been issued by one carrier, other carriers followed suit".

The Trans-Siberian Railroad (TSR) has recently become a more viable alternative to container ships on the Asia-Europe route. This railroad can typically deliver containers in 1/3 to 1/2 of the time of a sea voyage, and in late 2009 announced a 20% reduction in its container shipping rates. With its 2009 rate schedule, the TSR will transport a forty-foot container to Poland from Yokohama for $2,820, or from Pusan for $2,154.

=== Shipping industry alliances ===
Container ship industry alliances
Alliance	Partners	Ships	Weekly services	Ports	Port pairs
Ocean Alliance	CMA CGM, COSCO Shipping Lines, Evergreen	323	40	95	1,571
THE Alliance	Hapag-Lloyd, HMM Co Ltd., Ocean Network Express, Yang Ming	241	32	78	1,327
2M Alliance	Maersk Line, Mediterranean Shipping Company	223	25	76	1,152

In an effort to control costs and maximize capacity utilization on ever-larger ships, vessel sharing agreements, co-operative agreements, and slot-exchanges have become a growing feature of the maritime container shipping industry. As of March 2015, 16 of the world's largest container shipping lines had consolidated their routes and services accounting for 95 percent of container cargo volumes moving in the dominant east–west trade routes. Carriers remain operationally independent, as they are forbidden by antitrust regulators in multiple jurisdictions from colluding on freight rates or capacity. Similarities can be drawn with airline alliances.

In July 2016 the European Commission reported that it had raised concerns with 14 container shipping carriers regarding their practice of announcing General Rate Increases (GRIs) in a coordinated manner, which potentially conflicted with the EU and EEA rules on concerted practices which could distort competition (Article 101 of the Treaty on the Functioning of the European Union). The shipping companies announced a series of commitments aiming to address the commission's concerns, which for its part the Commission accepted as "legally binding" for the period from 2016 to 2019. General Rate Increases continue to be published in the industry either annually or sixth-monthly.

== Container ports ==
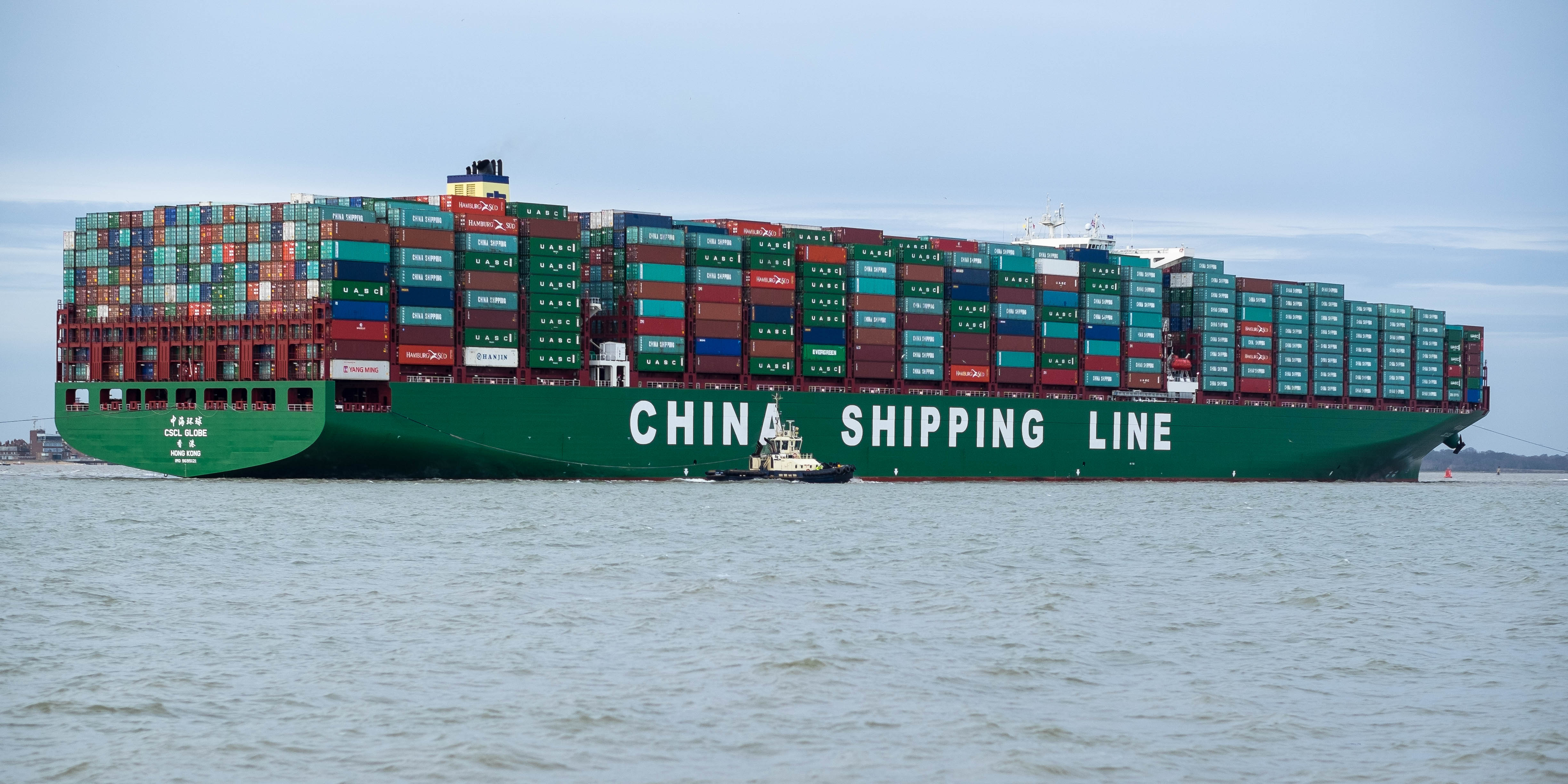
CSCL Globe is one of the largest container ships in the world.

Container traffic through a port is often tracked in terms of twenty foot equivalent units or TEU of throughput. As of 2019, the Port of Shanghai was the world's busiest container port, with 43,303,000 TEU handled.

That year, seven of the busiest ten container ports were in the People's Republic of China, with Shanghai in 1st place, Ningbo 3rd, Shenzhen 4th, Guangzhou 5th, Qingdao 7th, Hong Kong 8th and Tianjin 9th.

Rounding out the top ten ports were Singapore at 2nd, Busan in South Korea at 6th and Rotterdam in the Netherlands in the 10th position.

In total, the busiest twenty container ports handled 220,905,805 TEU in 2009, almost half of the world's total estimated container traffic that year of 465,597,537 TEU.

== Losses and safety problems ==
It has been estimated that container ships lose between 2,000 and 10,000 containers at sea each year, costing $370 million. A survey for the six years 2008 through 2013 estimates average losses of individual containers overboard at 546 per year, and average total losses including catastrophic events such as vessel sinkings or groundings at 1,679 per year More recently, a survey conducted by the WSC from 2008 to 2019, saw an average of 1,382 shipping containers lost at sea. However, in the 3-year period from 2017 to 2019, that number was nearly halved, down to an average of 779 containers lost annually. Most go overboard on the open sea during storms but there are some examples of whole ships being lost with their cargo. One major shipping accident occurred in 2013 when the MOL Comfort sank with 4,293 containers on board in the Indian Ocean. When containers are dropped, they immediately become an environmental threat – termed "marine debris". Once in the ocean, they fill with water and sink if the contents cannot hold air. Rough waters smash the container, sinking it quickly.

As container ships get larger and stacking becomes higher, the threat of containers toppling into the sea during a storm increases. This results from a phenomenon called "parametric rolling," by which a ship can roll 30-40 degrees during rough seas creating a powerful torque on a 10-high stack of containers which can easily snap lashings and locks of the stack, resulting in losses into the sea.

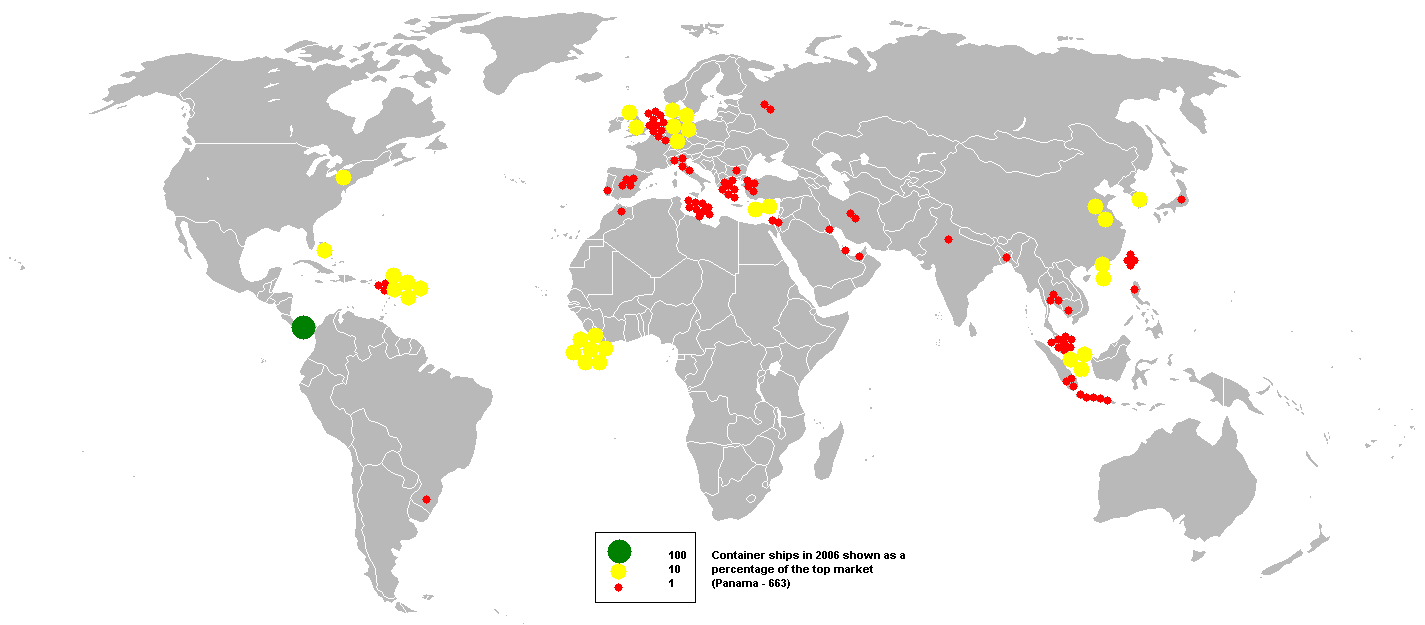
Container fleet in 2006

== See also ==
- BBC Box
- Container on barge
- Environmental impact of shipping
- List of largest container ships
- List of world's longest ships
- Ship resistance and propulsion
