= Li Kelin =

Chinese business executive (1942–2018)

Li Kelin (Chinese: 李克麟; 14 September 1942 – 1 February 2018) was a Chinese business executive who served as President of China Shipping Group, often considered the "father of the Chinese container shipping industry".

== Biography ==
Li was born in Zhenhai District, Zhejiang on 14 September 1942. He graduated from Shanghai Maritime University, joined Shanghai Shipping Corporation in 1961, and was promoted to captain in 1971. He later became General Manager of Shanghai Shipping Corporation and then Deputy CEO of COSCO Group.

In 1997, Li was appointed the first CEO of the newly established China Shipping Group. The global shipping industry was experiencing a severe downturn because of the 1997 Asian financial crisis, and Li seized the opportunity to purchase and order many ships at very low costs. When the market recovered, China Shipping profited handsomely from his deals.

When the shipping industry had another downturn in 2002 following the September 11 attacks, Li again decided to expand the company fleet when the cost was low. He spent CN¥2 billion purchasing container ships and ordered 80,000 shipping containers. When the market recovered again, China Shipping made a profit of US$600 million.

Li retired from China Shipping in 2006. In 2008, he became chairman of Hainan PO Shipping, which went bankrupt in 2013.

On 1 February 2018, Li died at Huashan Hospital in Shanghai.
