= COSCO Shipping International =

COSCO Shipping International (Hong Kong) Co., Ltd.
- former logo
- Formerly: Shun Shing Holdings Limited; COSCO International Holdings Limited
- Company type: listed
- Traded as: SEHK: 517
- Industry: Shipping
- Predecessor: Shun Shing Construction
- Founded: 1991
Headquarters
Hong Kong, China	(de facto)
Hamilton, Bermuda	(registered office)
- Area served: Worldwide
- Products: Marine paint; etc.
- Services: Marine insurance; Ship trading; etc.
- Revenue: ▼HK$3266 million (2019)
- Net income: ▲HK$331 million (2019)
- Total assets: ▲HK$9377 million (2019)
- Total equity: ▲HK$7926 million (2019)
- Owner: COSCO Shipping HK (66.12%)
- Parent: COSCO Shipping (via COSCO Shipping HK)
- Subsidiaries: Shun Shing Construction (sold)

Chinese name
- Traditional Chinese: 中遠海運國際（香港）有限公司
Transcriptions

short name
- Traditional Chinese: 中遠海運國際
Transcriptions

former name
- Traditional Chinese: 中遠國際控股有限公司
Transcriptions
- Website: hk.coscoshipping.com
- Footnotes / references in consolidated financial statements

COSCO Shipping International (Hong Kong) Co., Ltd., stylized as COSCO SHIPPING International, and formerly COSCO International Holdings Limited, is a Hong Kong listed company and an indirect subsidiary of COSCO Shipping. It engages in ship trading and supplying services. It is headquartered in Hong Kong and it is listed in the Stock Exchange of Hong Kong (SEHK) since 1992.

COSCO Shipping International (Hong Kong) is incorporated in Bermuda, as an offshore company. It is a red chip company.

== History ==
The company became a listed company since 1992. The company was known as Shun Shing Holdings and then COSCO International and currently COSCO Shipping International (Hong Kong).

=== Shun Shing Holdings ===
Shun Shing Holdings is a company incorporated on 9 September 1991 in Bermuda and registered as a "foreign company" in Hong Kong in 1992. On 11 February 1992, Shun Shing Holdings became a listed company. It is a parent company of a Hong Kong-based main contractor, Shun Shing Construction & Engineering (or in short, Shun Shing Construction; Chinese: 順成建築工程). Shun Shing Construction had Singapore branch in the past. The Singapore unit formed a joint venture with Low Keng Huat and was awarded a contract as a main contractor for a residential housing estate project in 1994.

In 1997, the listed company was acquired by China Ocean Shipping (Group) Corporation (COSCO). The listed company suffered from an accounting scandal afterwards, as the new external auditors employed by the new owner, failed to discover the accounting irregularity made by the previous ownership. The scandal later led to Hong Kong Institute of Certified Public Accountants (HKICPA) sue its own sub-committee. HKICPA once start a disciplinary investigation on the auditors but the sub-committee cancelled it. HKICPA demanded in the court to authorize themselves to re-elect a new board for the sub-committee, and restart the disciplinary investigation .

=== COSCO Shipping International (Hong Kong) ===
In 1997 the listed company was acquired by the Hong Kong division of China Ocean Shipping (Group) Corporation (COSCO). After the acquisition, the listed company, known as COSCO International at that time, engaged in real estate, civil construction and provides services for ship. It also sold paints to shipping companies as well as a provider of marine insurance.

In 2001, COSCO International was the developer of Broadview Court, a public housing estates in Wong Chuk Hang (Private Sector Participation Scheme). The client of the project is the Housing Authority, while the estate was sold to the general public as part of the Home Ownership Scheme.

In 2005, the listed company sold eight floors of COSCO Tower, an office building, to its direct parent company, COSCO (Hong Kong), for HK$1.4 billion. In February 2007, the listed company sold its former main business, Shun Shing Construction, to the parent company.

COSCO International was a shareholder of a fellow listed company, fellow land developer, Sino-Ocean Group. However, it was announced to sell of their shareholding in 2010. At that time, COSCO International was the second largest shareholder of Sino-Ocean Group for 16.85% stake.

In 2015, the ultimate parent company, COSCO, merged with China Shipping Group to become China COSCO Shipping, or known as COSCO Shipping. Thus, the listed company was renamed into COSCO Shipping International (Hong Kong) Co., Ltd..

In 2018, the company acquired a manufacturer of marine paint as part of a vertical integration strategy of the company.

== Shareholders ==
COSCO Shipping International (Hong Kong) is a listed company. As of November 2020, the market capitalization is HK$4 billion (Not yet free-float adjusted).

As of 31 December 2019, private company, COSCO Shipping (Hong Kong), is the parent company of COSCO Shipping International, which owns 66.12% shares of COSCO Shipping International (Hong Kong). COSCO Shipping (Hong Kong) is in turn parented by Mainland China incorporated China Ocean Shipping Company (COSCO) and ultimately, China COSCO Shipping (COSCO Shipping). COSCO Shipping is one of the entity that was supervised by the State-owned Assets Supervision and Administration Commission (SASAC) of the State Council, making COSCO Shipping International qualifies for one of the criteria of red chip.

Fellow listed companies COSCO Shipping Ports, COSCO Shipping Holdings, COSCO Shipping Development, COSCO Shipping Energy, COSCO Shipping International (Singapore), are sister companies of COSCO Shipping International (Hong Kong). None of them are shareholders/subsidiaries of COSCO Shipping International (Hong Kong).

COSCO Shipping International (Singapore) privatized fellow listed company Cogent Holdings in 2017, but not COSCO Shipping International (HK).
