= COSCO Tower =

Cosco Tower
- 中遠大廈
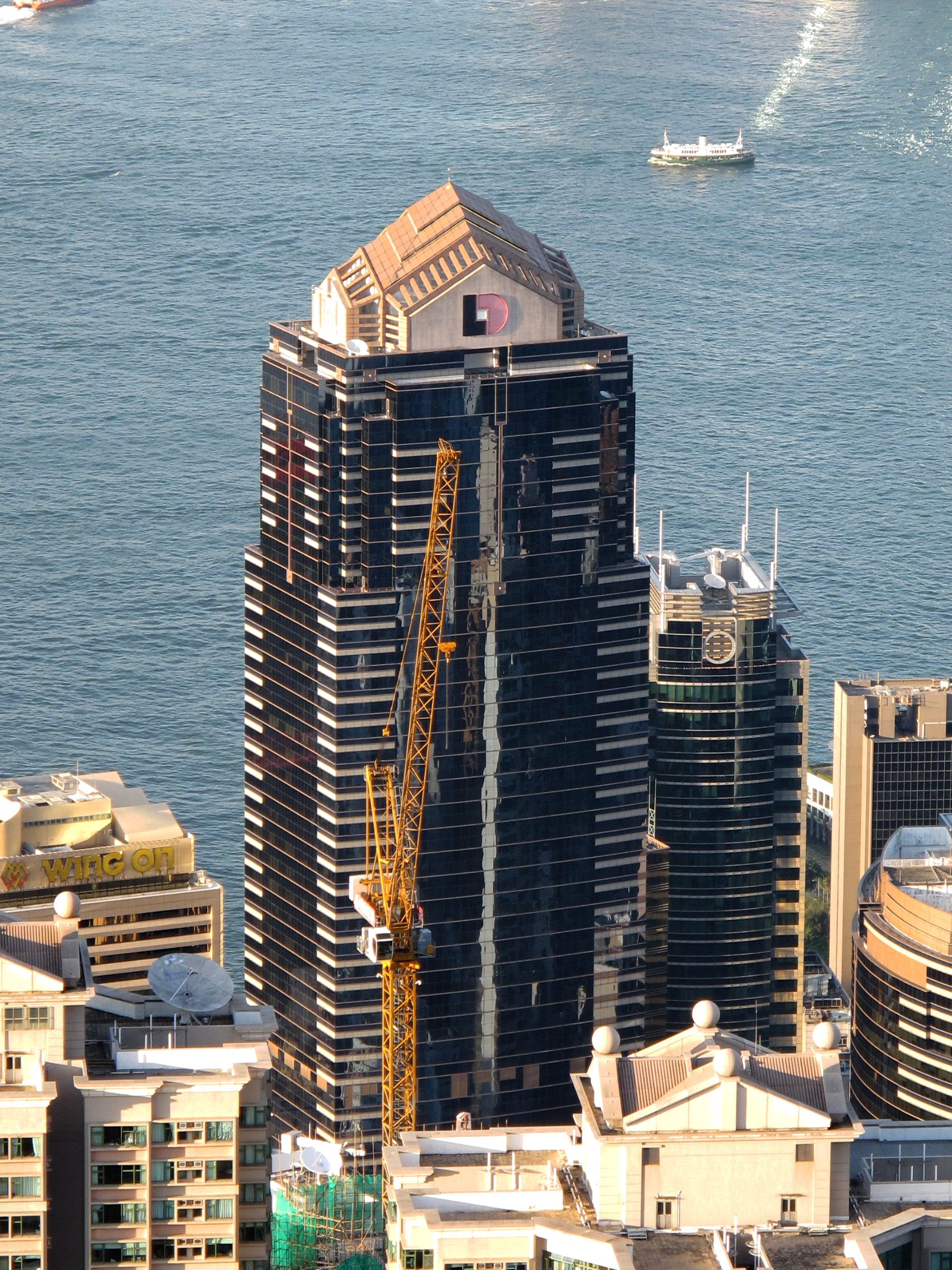
- Cosco Tower
- Interactive map of the Cosco Tower area

General information
- Status: Completed
- Type: Office
- Architectural style: postmodern
- Location: 183 Queen's Road Central, Sheung Wan, Hong Kong
- Coordinates: 22.28543°N 114.15309°E
- Completed: 1998; 28 years ago
- Owner: COSCO

Height
- Height: 228 m (748 ft)

Technical details
- Floor count: 53
- Lifts/elevators: 4

Design and construction
- Architects: Hsin Yieh Architects & Associates Ltd.

The Cosco Tower (Chinese: 中遠大廈; Cantonese Yale: Jūngyuhn Daaihhah) is an office tower in the Grand Millennium Plaza in western Hong Kong Island in Hong Kong. The tower has a total structural height of 228 m (748 ft). Construction of the Cosco Tower was completed in 1998. There are 56 floors, 53 of which are above ground.

The building was developed by the Land Development Corporation.

== Notable tenants ==
- COSCO
  - COSCO Shipping International
- Urban Renewal Authority

== See also ==
- List of tallest buildings
- List of tallest buildings in Hong Kong
