= COSCO Shipping Ports =

Hong Kong-based port operator

COSCO Shipping Ports Limited
- Company logo
- Formerly: COSCO Pacific Limited
- Company type: State-owned enterprise (Red chip); Public company
- Traded as: SEHK: 1199
- Industry: Shipping and Logistics
- Founded: 26 July 1994; 31 years ago
Headquarters
Hong Kong, China	(de facto)
Hamilton, Bermuda	(registered office)
- Area served: Worldwide
- Services: Port operator
- Owner: COSCO Shipping Holdings (47.26%)
- Parent: China COSCO Shipping (via COSCO Shipping Holdings)
- Website: ports.coscoshipping.com

COSCO Shipping Ports Limited, stylized as COSCO SHIPPING Ports is a Hong Kong listed company and investor in ports. The company is formerly known as COSCO Pacific Limited and was an indirect subsidiary of COSCO and now part of its successor, COSCO Shipping. It is mainly engaged in container terminal operations, container manufacturing and leasing, shipping agency and freight forwarding.

COSCO Pacific was a Hang Seng Index constituent (blue chip) from 2003 to 2014. COSCO Pacific also a red chip company so that it once considered as a purple chip company.

== History ==
COSCO Pacific Limited is a Bermuda incorporated company and was a subsidiary of China Ocean Shipping (Group) Company (COSCO). In 1994, it became a listed company in the Stock Exchange of Hong Kong (SEHK). At that time, Hong Kong is a British colony and not yet handover back to the People's Republic of China. After the 1997 handover, Hong Kong still has a separate jurisdiction apart from the Mainland China. Since COSCO Pacific was incorporated in Hong Kong but indirectly controlled by the Chinese government, the company is considered as a red chip.

COSCO Pacific, partnered with Hongkong International Terminals, operates the Terminal 8 (East) of Kwai Tsing Container Terminals since 1991. Hong Kong was once busiest container port in which Kwai Tsing Terminals is the main container port of the city.

From 1997 to 2007, COSCO Pacific was a minority shareholder (20%) of Liu Chong Hing Bank. From 2007 the stake was owned by COSCO Pacific's parent company, COSCO HK.

In 2003, COSCO Pacific is a co-investor of a phase of Qingdao Qianwan Container Terminal, for 20% shares of the SPV that carry the actual investment. In the same year, COSCO Pacific also formed a joint venture with PSA.

In 2008, COSCO Pacific made a bid for a 35-year concession to operate the container port of Piraeus. In 2016, COSCO Pacific's intermediate parent company, China COSCO Holdings, announced to make a bid of the ownership of the port.

In March 2016, COSCO Pacific's joint venture, COSCO-PSA Terminal, announced to expand the shipping terminal at Pasir Panjang, Singapore.

In July 2016, COSCO Pacific announced it plans to change its name to COSCO Shipping Ports Limited. The decision is linked to a merger and major reorganization of China Shipping Group and COSCO Group earlier in 2016.

COSCO Shipping ports built the Port of Chancay in Peru, the opening of which was celebrated during a November 2024 state visit by CCP General Secretary Xi Jinping to Peru. Chancay port is part of the Belt and Road Initiative. Xi described the port as the beginning of a new maritime-land corridor between China and Latin America.

== Shareholders ==
COSCO Shipping Ports is a listed company. As of November 2020, the market capitalization is HK$17 billion (Not yet free-float adjusted).

As of 31 December 2019, fellow listed company COSCO Shipping Holdings is the parent company of COSCO Shipping Ports. COSCO Shipping Holdings (via subsidiaries "COSCO Investments" and "China COSCO (Hong Kong)") owns 47.26% shares of COSCO Shipping Ports. COSCO Shipping Holdings is in turn parented by China Ocean Shipping Company (COSCO) and ultimately, China COSCO Shipping (COSCO Shipping). COSCO Shipping is one of the entity that was supervised by the State-owned Assets Supervision and Administration Commission (SASAC) of the State Council, making COSCO Shipping Ports qualifies for one of the criteria of red chip (another criterion is incorporated outside Mainland China, which COSCO Shipping Ports does).

COSCO Shipping Ports was a former constituents of Hang Seng Index, the blue chip index, until 2014, as well as Hang Seng China-Affiliated Corporations Index, formerly an index for notable red chips, until September 2020.

== Port assets ==
As of 31 December 2023, COSCO SHIPPING Ports operated and managed terminals at 38 ports globally.

City	Country	Port (Terminal)	Ownership
Abu Dhabi	United Arab Emirates	Khalifa Port (CSP Abu Dhabi Terminal)	40%
Antwerp	Belgium	Port of Antwerp (Antwerp Terminal)	20%
Bilbao	Spain	Port of Bilbao (CSP Bilbao Terminal)	39.51%
Busan	South Korea	Port of Busan (Busan Terminal)	4.23%
Chancay	Peru	Port of Chancay (CSP Chankay Terminal)	60%
Dalian	China	Port of Dalian (Dalian Container Terminal)	19%
Dalian	China	Port of Dalian (Dalian Dagang Terminal)	35%
Guangzhou	China	Port of Guangzhou (Guangzhou Nansha Stevedoring Terminal)	40%
Guangzhou	China	Port of Guangzhou (Guangzhou South China Oceangate Container Terminal)	39%
Hamburg	Germany	Port of Hamburg (Container Terminal Tollerort)	24.99%
Hong Kong	China	Port of Hong Kong (Asia Container Terminal)	60%
Hong Kong	China	Port of Hong Kong (COSCO - HIT Terminal)	50%
Istanbul	Turkey	Kumport Port (Kumport Terminal)	26%
Jeddah	Saudi Arabia	Jeddah Islamic Port (Red Sea Gateway Terminal)	20%
Jingjiang	China	Port of Jingjiang (Jingjiang Pacific Terminal)	80%
Jinzhou	China	Port of Jinzhou (Jinzhou New Age Terminal)	51%
Kaohsiung	Taiwan	Port of Kaohsiung (Kao Ming Container Terminal)	20%
Lianyungang	China	Port of Lianyungang (Lianyungang New Oriental Terminal)	55%
Nantong	China	Port of Nantong (Nantong Terminal)	51%
Ningbo	China	Port of Ningbo (Yuan Dong Terminal)	20%
Piraeus	Greece	Port of Piraeus (Piraeus Container Terminal)	100%
Port Said	Egypt	East Port Said (Suez Canal Container Terminal)	20%
Qinhuangdao	China	Port of Qinhuangdao (Qinhuangdao New Harbor Terminal)	30%
Qinzhou	China	Port of Beibu Gulf (Beibu Gulf Terminal)	30.32%
Quanzhou	China	Port of Meizhou Bay (Quanzhou Pacific Terminal)	82.35%
Rotterdam	Netherlands	Port of Rotterdam (Euromax Terminal)	17.85%
Seattle	United States	Port of Seattle (Seattle Terminal)	13.33%
Shanghai	China	Port of Shanghai (Shanghai Mingdong Terminal)	20%
Shanghai	China	Port of Shanghai (Shanghai Pudong Terminal)	30%
Singapore	Singapore	Port of Singapore (Cosco-PSA Terminal)	49%
Taicang	China	Port of Taicang (Taicang Terminal)	39.04%
Tianjin	China	Port of Tianjin (Tianjin Container Terminal)	51%
Vado Ligure	Italy	Port of Vado Ligure (Vado Terminal)	40%
Valencia	Spain	Port of Valencia (CSP Valencia Terminal)	51%
Wuhan	China	Port of Wuhan (CSP Wuhan Terminal)	84.94%
Shenzhen	China	Yantian Port (Yantian Terminal Phase I & II)	14.59%
Shenzhen	China	Yantian Port (Yantian Terminal Phase III)	13.36%
Yingkou	China	Port of Yingkou (Yinhkou Container Terminal)	50%
Yingkou	China	Port of Yingkou (Yinhkou New Century Terminal)	40%
Xiamen	China	Port of Xiamen (Xiamen Ocean Gate Container Terminal)	100%
Zeebrugge	Belgium	Port of Zeebrugge (CSP Zeebrugge Terminal)	90%
