= COSCO Shipping =

Chinese shipping and logistics services supplier

China COSCO SHIPPING Corporation Limited

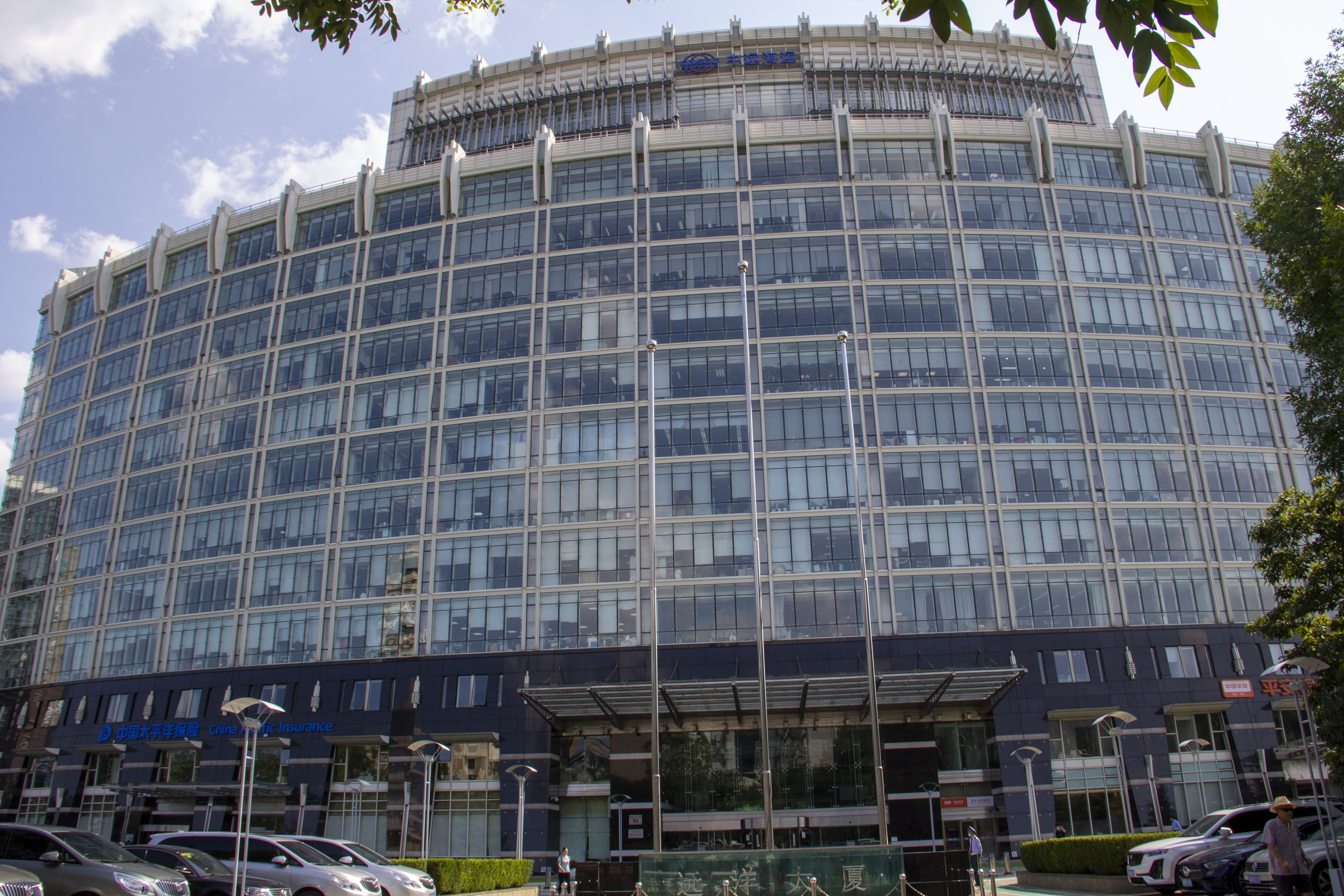
- COSCO SHIPPING Headquarters (Beijing)
- Native name: 中国远洋海运集团有限公司
- Type: State-owned enterprise
- Industry: Marine transportation
- Predecessor: COSCO Group; China Shipping Group
- Founded: 2016; 10 years ago
- Headquarters: Shanghai, China
- Area served: Worldwide
- Key people: Wan Min (Chairman/CCP Committee Secretary); Zajian Wong (COO); Meifeng Chen (CFO)
- Services: Marine transportation Stevedoring; Chartering; Shipbuilding
- Revenue: $44,655 million (2020)
- Total assets: $125,906.4 million (2020)
- Total equity: $28,202.6 million (2020)
- Number of employees: 118,243 (2020)
- Subsidiaries: COSCO SHIPPING Lines; COSCO SHIPPING Development; COSCO SHIPPING Specialized Carriers; COSCO SHIPPING Energy; COSCO SHIPPING International; COSCO SHIPPING Ports; COSCO SHIPPING Technology; China Shipping Group; Orient Overseas; OOCL
- Website: en.coscoshipping.com

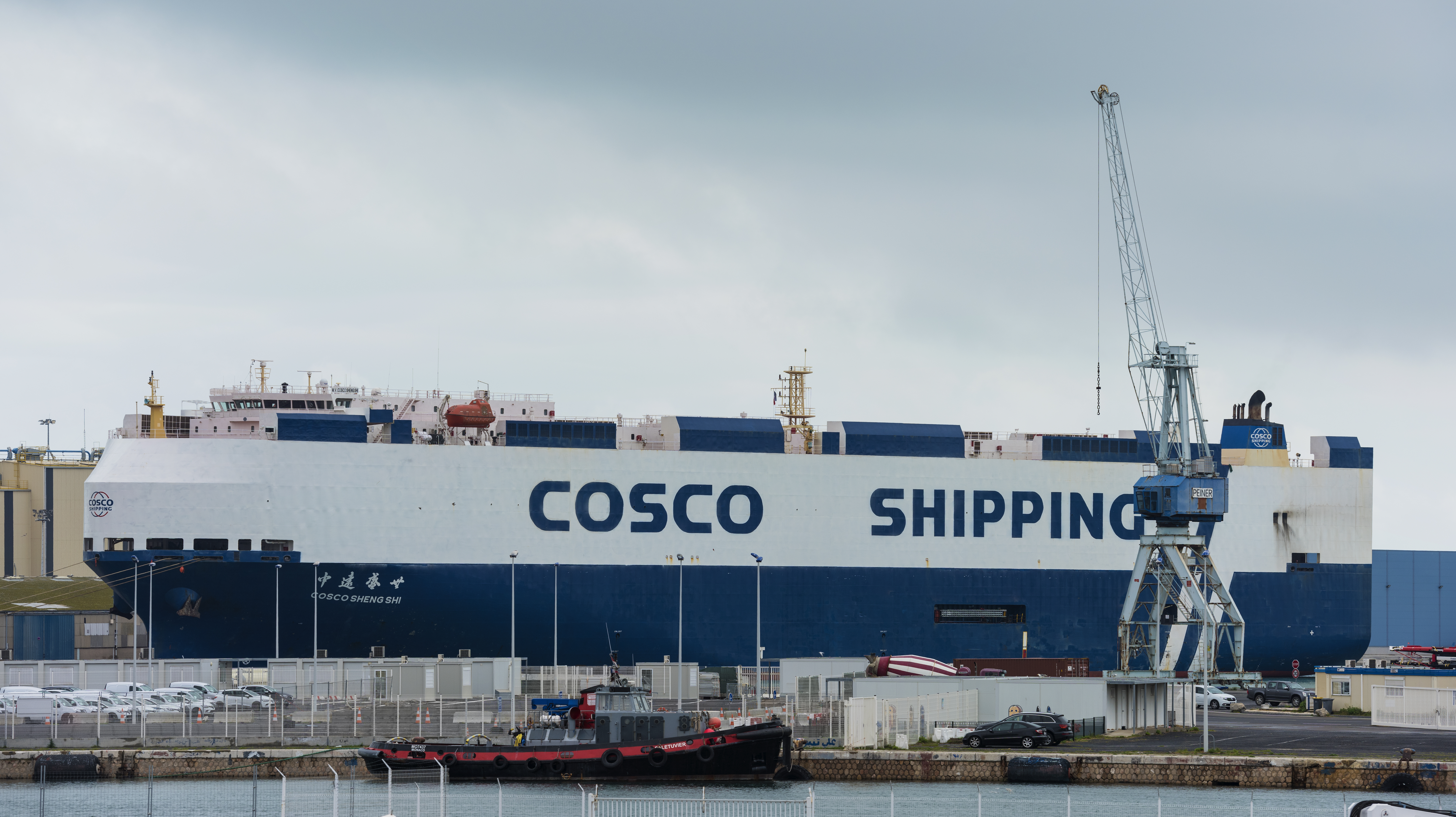
COSCO SHIPPING Shengshi, a vehicles carrier ship, Sète, 2018

China COSCO Shipping Corporation Limited (branded as COSCO Shipping) is a Chinese state-owned multinational marine transportation service conglomerate, headquartered in Shanghai. It was established in 2016 by the merger between China Ocean Shipping Company and China Shipping Group Company. It is owned by the State Council of China and supervised by the State-owned Assets Supervision and Administration Commission of the State Council.

== Predecessors ==
=== COSCO ===
China Ocean Shipping (Group) Company, founded in 1961 and headquartered in Beijing, was a Chinese state-owned multinational transportation conglomerate. It was the largest dry bulk carrier in China and one of the largest dry bulk shipping operators worldwide. The Group is the largest liner carrier in China. Its container shipping subsidiary – COSCO Container Lines – was one of the world's top 10 container carriers in terms of fleet capacity. COSCO was among China's top 15 brands in 2012.

=== China Shipping ===
China Shipping (Group) Company was founded in 1997 and was headquartered in Shanghai. The group was a Chinese state-owned multinational transportation conglomerate. By May 2014, China Shipping's container shipping subsidiary – China Shipping Container Lines – operated 156 container vessels with 656,000 TEU capacity. China Shipping Container Lines' container ship CSCL Globe was the world largest in 2014. China Shipping's other subsidiaries operated oil tankers, tramps, passenger ships, and car carriers.

== History ==
In January 2016, the Chinese State Council approved the merger of COSCO and China Shipping, forming COSCO Shipping. The merger – which occurred during a downturn in the marine transportation industry – sought to achieve economies of scale. The merger was also part of a Chinese government strategy to restructure its state-owned shipping sector.

Shortly after, subsidiary COSCO Shipping Holdings partnered with Shanghai International Port Group to acquire the majority stake of Orient Overseas from Tung Chee-hwa-Chee-chen families. The deal was completed in August 2018. Orient Overseas (International) is the parent company of OOCL. This will make it one of the world's largest container shipping company with a fleet of over 400 vessels.

In April 2016 the company agreed to buy 51% of Piraeus Port Authority, which is listed on the Athens Stock Exchange (Athex: PPA) and is a constituent of the FTSE/Athex Large Cap index. Its subsidiary Piraeus Container Terminal (PCT) has been operating two Piers at Piraeus Port since 2009.

In January 2017, the company was awarded $26.1 billion by the China Development Bank to participate in the Belt and Road Initiative. The funding would run through 2021. COSCO has used the finances to invest in its ports and infrastructure projects.

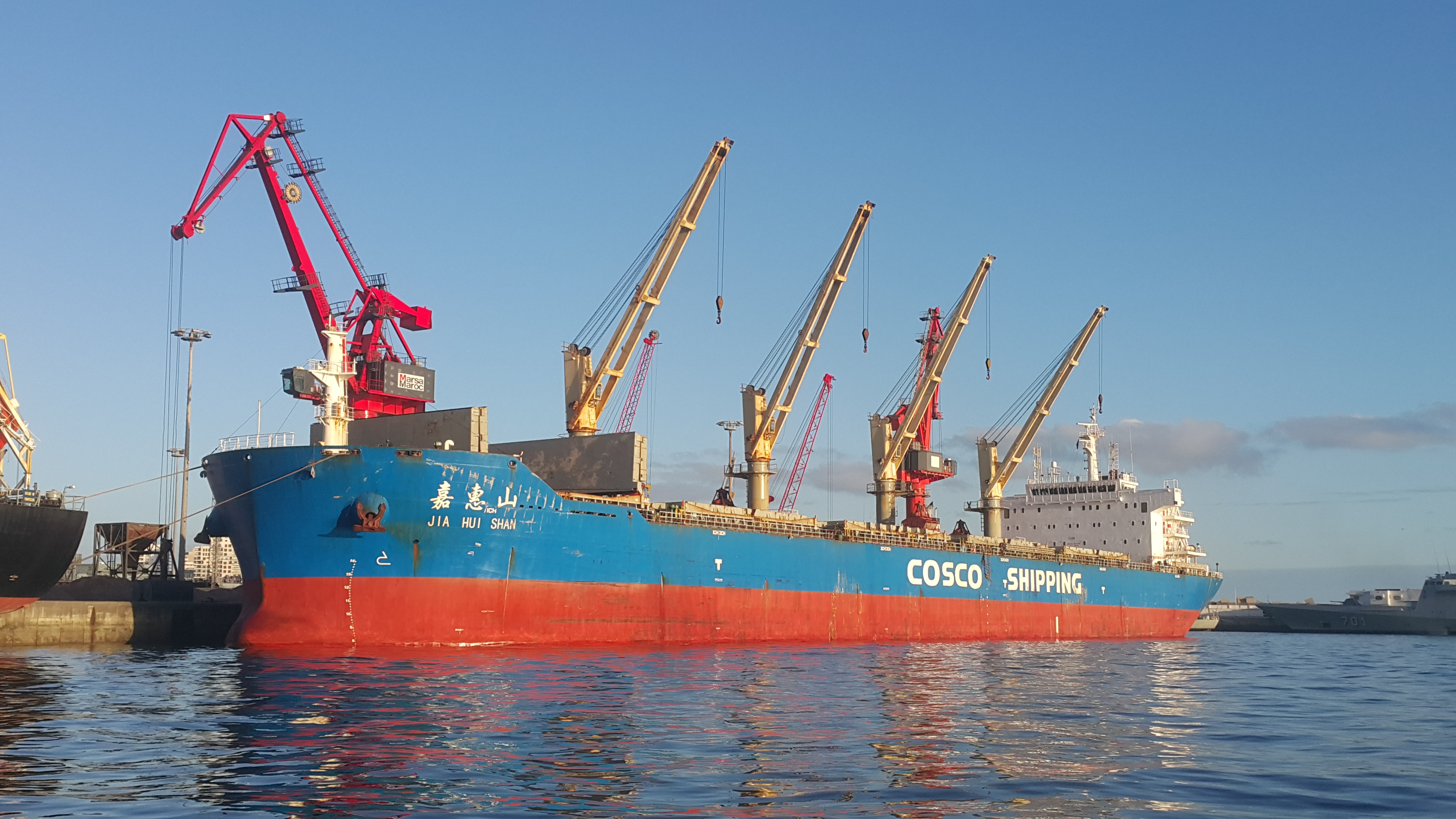
Jia Hui Shan, Port of Casablanca

In May 2017, the company signed a deal with Kazakhstan's national railway company to take 24% stake in an inland port in the Khorgos Eastern Gate Special Economic Zone. In December 2018, COSCO Shipping Ports secured a 35-year concession to operate and develop a newly built container terminal in Khalifa Port. In November 2019, the company invested $660 million to upgrade the Piraeus container port, Greece's largest port.

In May 2020, COSCO Shipping Ports, Dongfeng Commercial Vehicle, and China Mobile successfully transported a shipping container within Xiamen Ocean Gate Terminal using an AGV guided by 5G. The achievement demonstrated an application of 5G technology in developing a "smart port". At the event, the three companies announced a roadmap for large-scale implementation of 5G technology in ports.

In July 2020, the company entered into an agreement with Alibaba and its affiliate, Ant Group, to jointly promote cooperation on the application of a shipping blockchain.

COSCO Shipping and its predecessor COSCO, has a Hong Kong division, COSCO Shipping (Hong Kong) Limited, a private company formerly known as COSCO (Hong Kong) Group Limited. This acquired listed company COSCO Shipping International (at that time, Shun Shing Holdings) as a vehicle of backdoor listing in 1997 and bought the real estate businesses, such as Shun Shing Construction and an office building, from COSCO Shipping International in the 2000s.

In 1997, COSCO (HK) Group purchased a 20% stake in Lai Sun Hotels. After the 1997 Asian financial crisis, Lai Sun Development, the parent company of Lai Sun Hotels, scrapped the IPO of Lai Sun Hotels and sold all the assets of Lai Sun Hotels instead.

In 2023, Three Stars Ltd, the Bulgarian agent of COSCO Shipping Lines, was accused in the local media of racketeering and violating antitrust laws.

The company was a shareholder in the Chinese real estate developer, Sino-Ocean Group. The stake was sold in 2010. It was reported that the SASAC of the State Council has ordered Government owned companies to sell real estate development unit if it is not their main businesses.

=== U.S. sanctions ===
In September 2019, the United States Department of the Treasury sanctioned the tanker subsidiary of COSCO Shipping, COSCO Shipping Tanker (Dalian) Seaman & Ship Management, and COSCO Shipping Tanker (Dalian), for breaching the United States sanctions against Iran. However, the parent company of the aforementioned companies were not sanctioned. The US lifted the sanctions against COSCO Shipping in January 2020.

In January 2025, COSCO was added to a United States Department of Defense list of companies that allegedly work with the People's Liberation Army. In August 2026, the United States accused COSCO of using concealed equipment to spy on military communications near the coastlines of target nations.

== COSCO Shipping Holdings ==
COSCO Shipping Holdings Co., Ltd.
- Formerly: China COSCO Holdings Company Limited
- Type: Public company
- Traded as: SEHK: 1919; SSE: 601919; CSI A100
- Industry: Shipping and Logistics
- Founded: 2005
Headquarters
Shanghai, China	(de facto)
Tianjin, China	(registered office)
- Area served: People's Republic of China
- Key people: Legal Representative and Chairman: Mr. Ma Zehua (马泽华)
- Services: Container shipping, Dry bulk shipping, Third party logistics, Freight forwarding, Terminal and container leasing
- Revenue: 281,836,600,000 renminbi (2018)
- Owner: COSCO Shipping
- Parent: COSCO Shipping (via COSCO Group)
- Subsidiaries: COSCO Pacific; COSCO Shipping Lines
- Website: en.hold.coscoshipping.com

COSCO Shipping Holdings Co., Ltd., formerly China COSCO Holdings Company Limited was established in the People's Republic of China in 2005. It is the listed flagship and a subsidiary of China Ocean Shipping (Group) Company ("COSCO Group"), the largest integrated shipping company in China.

China COSCO Holdings provides a wide range of container shipping, dry bulk shipping, third party logistics, freight forwarding, Terminal and container leasing domestically and internationally. It is headquartered in Shanghai.

=== History ===
In June 2005, its H shares were listed on the Hong Kong Stock Exchange. In June 2007, its A shares were listed on the Shanghai Stock Exchange.

China COSCO recorded a loss for financial years 2011 and 2012 and could face a delisting from the Shanghai Stock Exchange if it made a loss for the third consecutive year. In March 2013, China COSCO recorded a profit of RMB 235.47 million for the 2013 financial year and avoided the possible delisting.

=== Reorganization and asset restructuring ===
In December 2015, COSCO Group underwent a major reorganisation with China Shipping Group to form the new China COSCO Shipping Corporation Limited.

As part of the reorganization, China COSCO sold 100% of equity interest in China COSCO Bulk Shipping (Group) Co., Ltd. to COSCO Group, representing the disposal of its dry bulk shipping business. After the reorganization, China COSCO focused on the container shipping business.

China COSCO bought a certain amount of equity interest of 30 onshore agency companies from China Shipping Container Lines ("CSCL") and its subsidiary. China COSCO entered into a lease agreement with CSCL, to lease the vessels and containers owned or operated by CSCL. After the transaction and agreement, China COSCO acquired the container services-related assets previously owned by CSCL, and became one of the world's leading container shipping and terminal service providers.

== See also ==
- Largest container shipping companies
- COSCO fleet lists
- COSCO Group
- COSCO (Hong Kong) Group
- COSCO Shipping Ports
- COSCO Shipping International
- China International Marine Containers
