= COSCO =

Chinese shipping and logistics services supplier

China Ocean Shipping Company
- Native name: 中国远洋运输有限公司
- Formerly: China Ocean Shipping (Group) Corporation
- Company type: Subsidiary; state-owned
- Industry: Transportation
- Founded: April 27, 1961; 65 years ago
- Defunct: 2016
- Fate: became a subsidiary
- Successor: China COSCO Shipping
- Headquarters: Xicheng, Beijing, China
- Area served: Worldwide
- Services: Freight forwarding Shipbuilding; Ship repairing Terminal operations
- Website: cosco.com (archived)

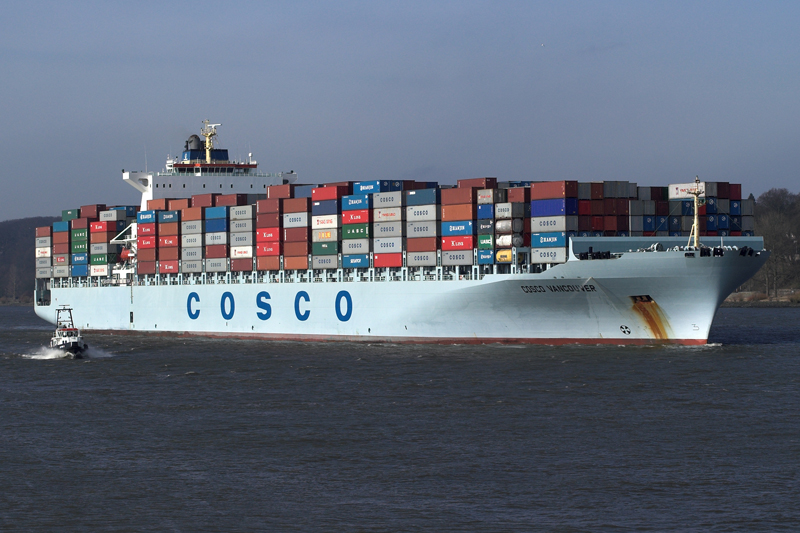
COSCO Vancouver

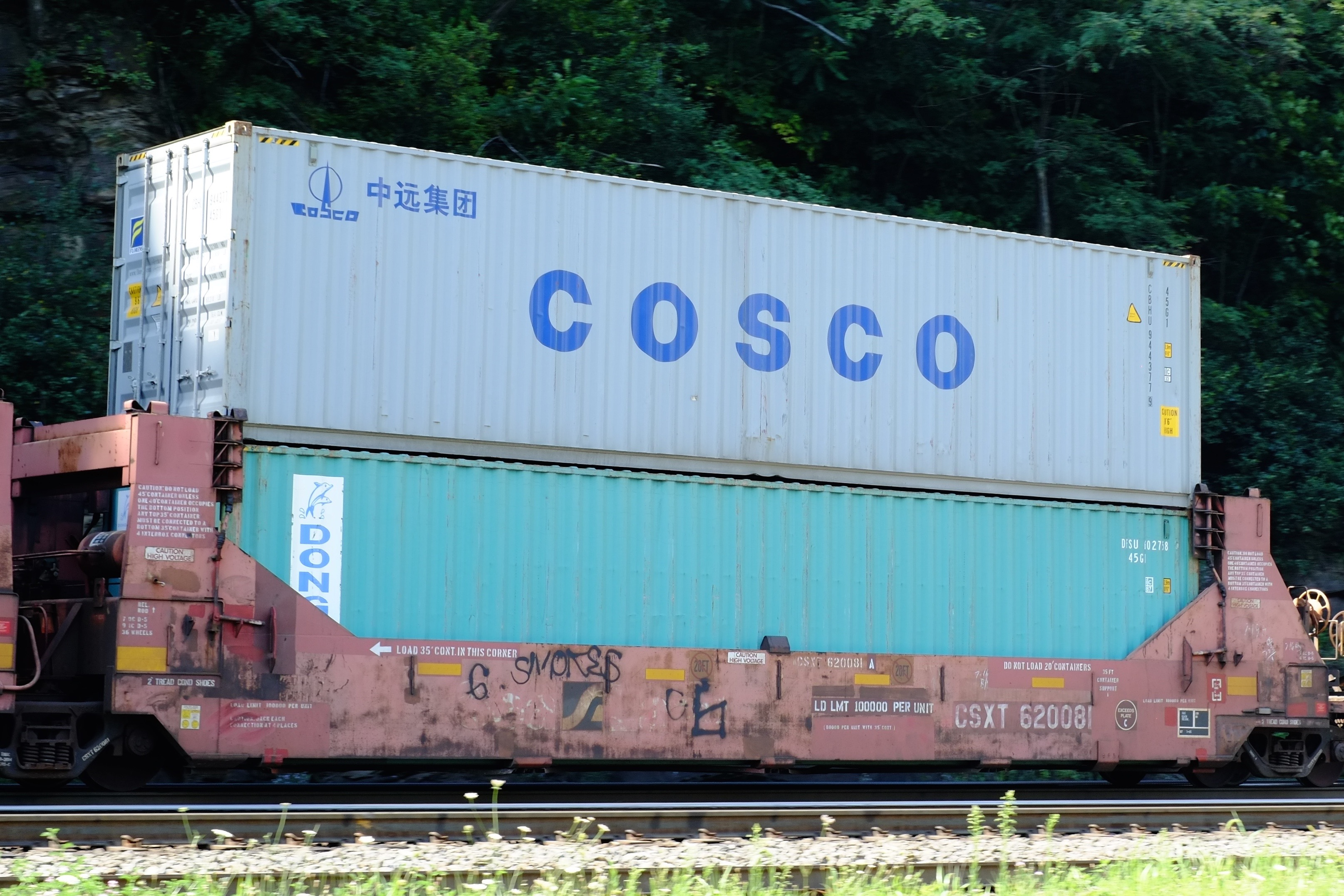
COSCO 40 foot container

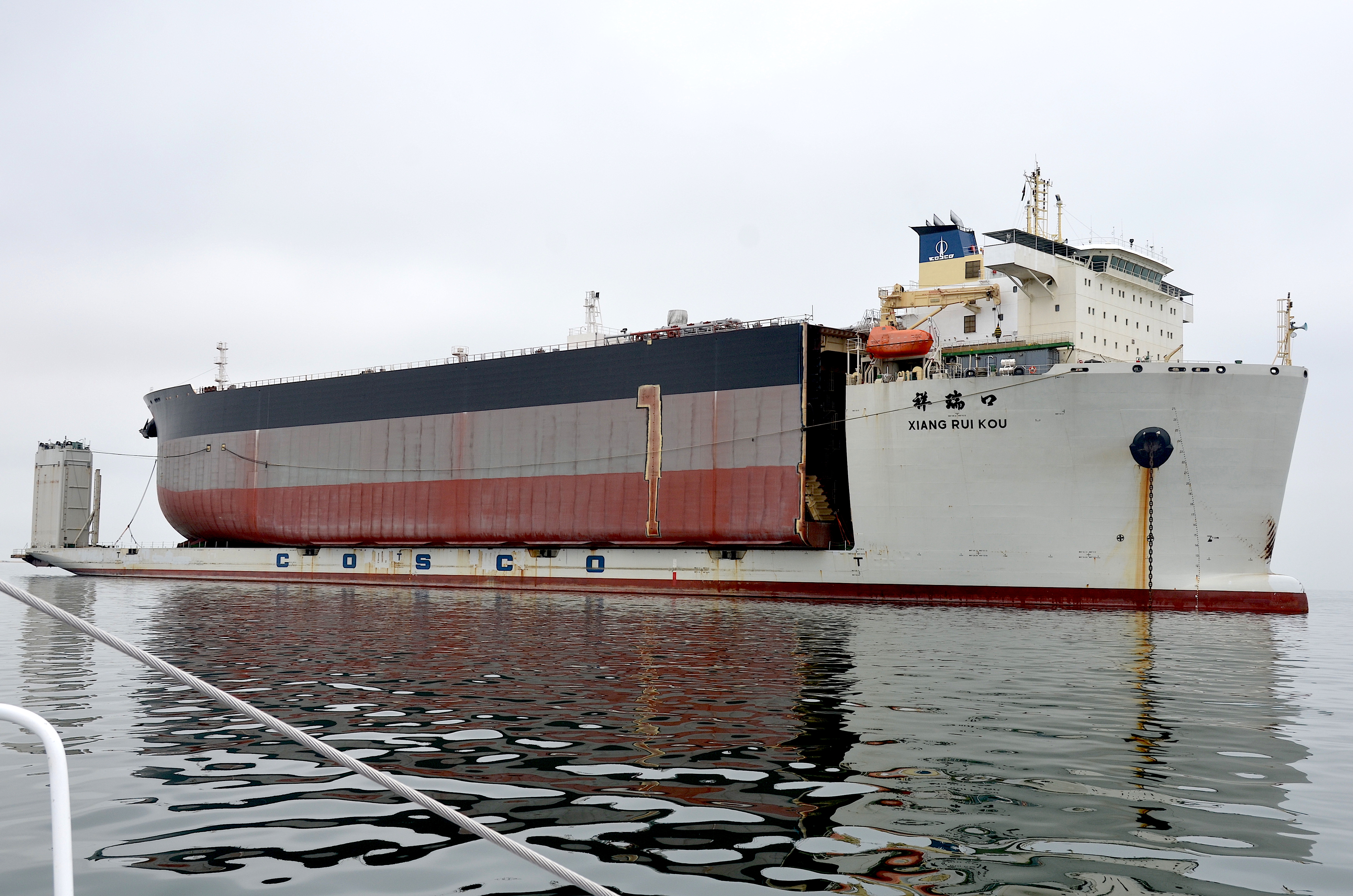
Semi-submersible heavy lift vessel Xiang Rui Kou

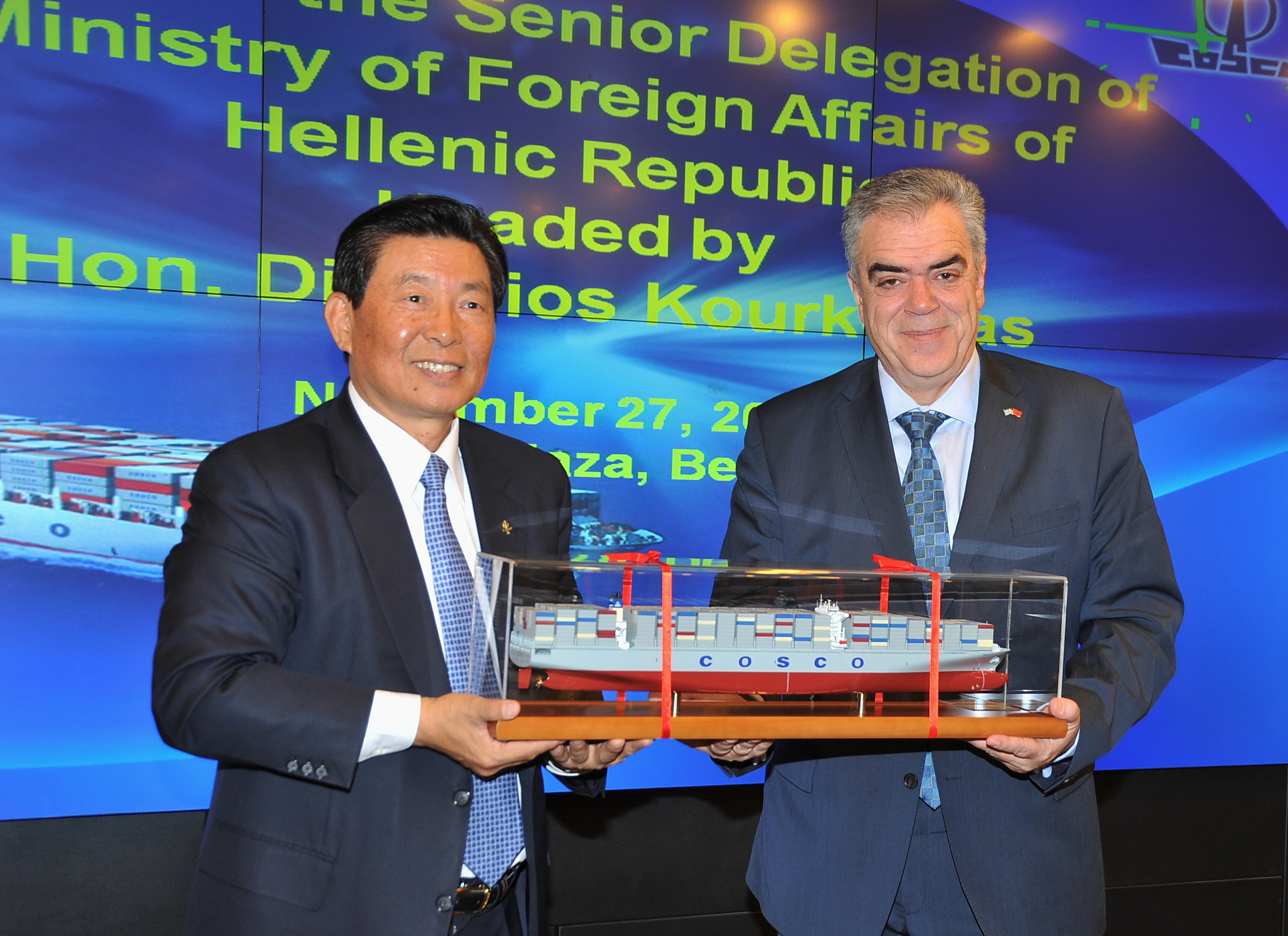
President of COSCO Group Capt. Wei Jiafu (left) meets with Deputy Foreign Minister of Greece, Dimitris Kourkoulas (right), 2012.

China Ocean Shipping Company (COSCO) was a former shipping corporation from 1961 to 2016, owned by the State Council of China and supervised by the State-owned Assets Supervision and Administration Commission of the State Council. The company merged with China Shipping Group Company to form China COSCO Shipping Corporation in January 2016.

COSCO was founded in 1961 as a state-owned shipping and logistics services supplier company.

COSCO headquarters is in Ocean Plaza in the Xicheng District in Beijing. It owns 1114 ships, including 365 dry bulk vessels, a container fleet with a capacity of 1,580,000 twenty-foot equivalent units (TEU), and a tanker fleet of 120 vessels. The fleet calls at over a thousand ports worldwide. It ranks among the largest in both number of container ships and aggregate container volume in the world. In 2012, it was among China's top 15 brands.

It was the largest dry bulk carrier in China and one of the largest dry bulk shipping operators worldwide. In addition, the Group is the largest liner carrier in China.

COSCO division COSCO Shipping Port Company manages the company's port operations.

== History ==
=== China Ocean Shipping Company (1961–1993) ===
China Ocean Shipping Company, or COSCO in short, was founded in 1961 as a Chinese government agency. In the same year, a subsidiary was formed in Guangzhou, Guangdong Province. The Guangzhou subsidiary purchased a British vessel and renamed it as Guanghua (Chinese: 光华). Guanghua made its maiden voyage to Jakarta for the People's Republic of China in April 1961.

After the US resumed diplomatic relations with China in the 1970s, China Ocean Shipping Company signed an agreement with American company Lykes Brothers Steamship Company in 1979. The agreement opens the commercial sea routes between the United States and the People's Republic of China. In the same year, COSCO became the Chinese side representative to collaborate with International Telephone and Telegraph on repairing the communication facilities in the coastal cities of China.

In 1981, COSCO won a contract from the Pakistani Government owned National Tanker Company of Pakistan, for crude oil transport.

In 1991 COSCO was asked by the US Federal Maritime Commission (FMC) to submit information regarding Chinese Government restricting U.S.-flag carriers on doing business in China. COSCO asked FMC to drop its probe instead. FMC also investigated COSCO for its pricing behavior in 1997, but stated there was not enough evidence to launch a formal probe on alleged under-pricing its service to eliminate competitor.

In August 1993, COSCO's ship Yinhe, was anchored off the coast of Oman. US government alleged that the ship carried material exported to Iran, which could be used to make chemical weapons. COSCO claimed that the ship only contained "paper goods, hardware and machine parts". In what became known as the Yinhe incident, United States military vessels and aircraft followed the Yinhe, disrupting its normal travel route. The United States unilaterally disabled the Yinhe's civilian GPS, causing it lose direction and anchor on the high seas for twenty-four days until it agreed to inspection. The Yinhe experienced shortages of water and fuel. The inspection, which occurred in Saudi Arabia did not find any improper chemicals and on September 4, representatives of the Chinese, Saudi and United States governments jointly signed a certification that the ship's cargo did not contain materials related to chemical weapons.

=== China Ocean Shipping (Group) Company (1993–2015) ===
The company became a holding company and renamed as China Ocean Shipping (Group) Company in 1993. Two other government owned companies, China Marine Bunker Supply Company (Chimbusco in short) and China Road Transport Company, which engaged in oil tanker and road transport businesses respectively, became the subsidiaries of the group in 1988 and 1992 respectively. China Road Transport Company was renamed into COSCO Logistics in 2001 (now part of COSCO Shipping Logistics). As of 2003, COSCO Logistics engaged in shipping agency, freight forwarding, third party logistics and supporting services. While Chimbusco became a joint venture with PetroChina since 2003.

COSCO has a Hong Kong division which the division acquired a HK-listed company Shun Shing Holdings (Note: After the acquisition, the listed company was known as COSCO International. As of 2020, is known as COSCO Shipping International (Hong Kong)) in February 1997. Hong Kong was a British colony until June 30, 1997, and has been a special administrative region of China with a separate jurisdiction system since July 1. Another subsidiary of COSCO HK at that time, COSCO Pacific, (Note: As of 2020, the company is known as COSCO Shipping Ports) was a HK-listed company since 1994. COSCO Pacific has a joint venture with Hongkong International Terminals Limited, which operates a terminal in Kwai Tsing Container Terminals, Hong Kong since 1991. COSCO Pacific acquired 49% stake of COSCO Logistics from the parent company in 2003. COSCO retained the remaining 51%. COSCO Pacific also owned 20% stake of Hong Kong-based Chong Hing Bank from 1997 to 2007. In 2007 the stake was sold to the parent company, COSCO HK.

In 1995, another subsidiary, COSCO Corporation (Singapore) Limited, (Note: As of 2020, the company is known as COSCO Shipping International (Singapore)) became a listed company in Singapore Exchange. The company was a component of Straits Times Index until 2010.

COSCO acquired a Shanghai-listed company in 1997 as a vehicle of backdoor listing. It became COSCO Development, (Note: COSCO Development and COSCO Shipping Development are not the same company. As of 2020, the listed company that formerly known as COSCO Development, is known as Shanghai Wanye Enterprises and no longer a real estate company) which engaged in real estate. The direct parent company of COSCO Development was sold in 2005, thus COSCO Development was no longer part of the COSCO Group. Also in 2005, COSCO Group acquired a company from COSCO Development. That company was the operator of Boao Forum for Asia.

In 1997, Dianne Feinstein and Barbara Boxer, United States senators from California, had asked the Clinton administration to investigate COSCO's leasing on a former naval base in Long Beach. The site was developed into a container port terminal, Pacific Container Terminal.

In 2002, another subsidiary, COSCO Shipping Co., Ltd., (Note: COSCO Shipping Co., Ltd. and China COSCO Shipping are not the same company. China COSCO Shipping is the ultimate parent company of the group. After the 2015 merger, COSCO Shipping Co., Ltd. was renamed COSCO Shipping Specialized Carriers Co., Ltd.) became a listed company in Shanghai.

In 2004, COSCO formed a joint venture with fellow Central Government owned Ansteel Group (Angang Group).

In 2005, the flagship subsidiary of COSCO, China COSCO Holdings, became a listed company. The A share of China COSCO Holdings was listed in Shanghai since 2007.

After the post-2008 financial crisis collapse of global shipping, COSCO began gradually acquiring the Greek port of Piraeus. Under COSCO, Piraeus has become a busy port, rising from traffic of 400,000 containers in 2008 to nearly five million containers in 2018. Most European trade with China occurs via Greek ships, including through Piraeus.

During the 2022 Russian invasion of Ukraine, most shipping companies halted all container shipping to Russia, except for basic food products, medicine and humanitarian aid. The exception is COSCO which continues to ship to Russia, and was the largest shipping company to do so.

=== Mergers ===
In 2005, a smaller Central Government owned company, China Ocean Shipping Tally (known as China Tally in short), was merged into COSCO Group.

In 2008, China COSCO Holdings was part of Financial Times Global 500 for the first time.

By 2015, after more than 5 decades, COSCO Group expanded into one of the major shipping company of the country. It also had a few listed subsidiaries: COSCO Pacific, COSCO International Holdings, China COSCO Holdings, China International Marine Containers, etc., . Real estate developer, Sino-Ocean Group, was an associate company of COSCO until 2010.

In December 2015, COSCO Group merged with fellow Chinese Government owned China Shipping Group to form China COSCO Shipping. COSCO Group was retained as an intermediate holding company.

In December 2017, COSCO Group (China Ocean Shipping (Group) Company) was re-incorporated from "An industrial enterprise owned by the whole people" to simply a limited company. The name of the company, also changed to China Ocean Shipping Company, Limited (Chinese: 中国远洋运输有限公司).

== Subsidiaries ==
COSCO contains several listed companies and has more than 300 subsidiaries locally and abroad, providing services in freight forwarding, ship building, ship repair, terminal operation, container manufacturing, trade, financing, real estate, and information technology.

On the eve of 2015 merger, COSCO Group has a few listed companies:

- China COSCO Holdings (SEHK: 1919; SSE: 601919) - flagship listed subsidiary, also known as "China COSCO" or "COSCO Holdings"
  - COSCO Pacific (SEHK: 1199) - port operator and investor. Significantly (43.63%) owned by China COSCO Holdings as of 31 December 2015
- COSCO International (SEHK: 517)
- COSCO Shipping Co., Ltd. (SSE:600428) - engaged in specialized carriers. COSCO owned 50.58% shares directly.
- COSCO Corporation (Singapore) (SGX:F83)
- Cosco SHIPPING Lines (Japan)

Moreover, China International Marine Containers is an associate company of the group, which COSCO indirectly owned 22.77% shares of that listed company as of December 2015. The stake was owned by COSCO Pacific until 2013.

As of 2000, COSCO also owned 30% stake of China Cargo Airlines.

COSCO also had an unlisted business unit in Hong Kong, which was known as COSCO (Hong Kong) Group Limited. COSCO (H.K.) Group was the direct parent company of COSCO Pacific (valid until December 2004) and COSCO International. COSCO (H.K.) Group bought the 20% stake of Chong Hing Bank and the entire stake of Shun Shing Construction from COSCO Pacific and COSCO International respectively in 2007.

== Accidents ==
=== 2009 Norway oil spill ===
On 31 July 2009, the Panama-flagged bulk carrier, Full City, operated by COSCO Group's HK division, experienced engine failure and ran aground near Langesund, Telemark, Norway, during a storm, spilling 200 tons of heavy bunker fuel oil in an ecologically and environmentally sensitive wildlife area.

== See also ==
- COSCO fleet lists
- List of oil spills
- Shipping industry of China
- List of container shipping companies by ship fleets and containers
- Chipolbrok
