= Qingdao Qianwan Container Terminal =

Port of Shandong, China

Coordinates: 36°0′16″N 120°12′10″E

Qingdao Qianwan Container Terminal is a port of China, located at Qianwan, Qingdao, Shandong province. Qingdao Port ranked 10th in 2008 world's busiest container ports with 10,320 thousands TEU, current projects were expected to raise the capacity to 15,000 thousands or more.

Phase 2 & 3 were held by Qingdao Qianwan Container Terminal Co., Ltd (QQCT), a joint venture of Qingdao Port (Group) Co (31%), Dubai Ports World (29%), COSCO Pacific (20% interests, 18.18% voting power) and Maersk (20%). Phase 2 and 3 had 11 berths.

Phase 4, as Qingdao New Qianwan Terminal (QQCTN), located in south bank, was a joint venture of Qingdao Qianwan Container Terminal Co., Ltd, (80%) and Pan Asia International Shipping (20%, which started to build in 2007. In 2009, the first 4 out of 10 berths started to operate.

Co-currently, China Merchants Holdings (International) reached an agreement with Qingdao Qianwan International Logistic Park to build a port for the Logistic Park in September 2003., which had 5 berths dedicated for container (which CMHI holds 100% interests) and 2 multi-purpose berths. The whole project CMHI holds 90.1% interests. The project started the construction in 2005.

In December 2009, China Merchants International Container Terminal (Qingdao) Co., Ltd., the wholly subsidiary of CMHI, reached an agreement with QQCTN to set up a new joint venture company Qingdao Qianwan United Container Terminal Co., Ltd., (QQCTU) to engaged in the construction, operation and management current and future projects in the south bank, and take-over the current berths of China Merchants (5 berths) and QQCTN (4 berths).

== Data ==
Phase	Berths (no.)	Depth (m)	Quay Length (m)	Annual Handling capacity (thousands TEU)
1	?	?	?	?
2 & 3	11	17.5	3,400	6,500
4	10	15 – 20	3,408	6,000
CM	3	17	1,190 (all as of Dec 08)	2,500
