= Yantian International Container Terminals =

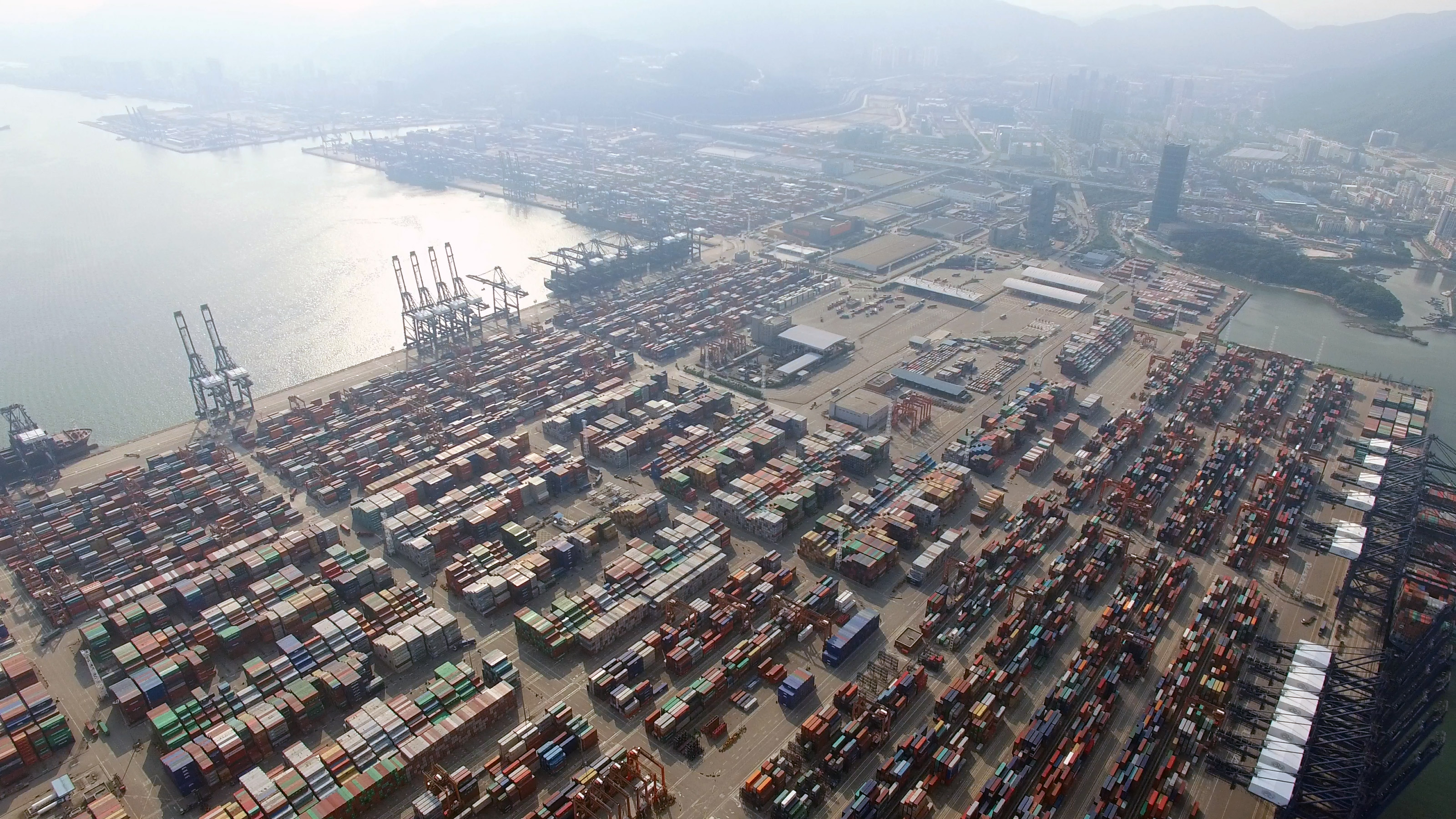
- Yantian Port
- Interactive map of Yantian International Container Terminals

Location
- Country: China
- Coordinates: 22.5733695°N 114.2741338°E

Details
- Opened: 1994
- Operated by: Shenzhen Yantian Port Group and Hutchison Port Holdings
- Size: 373 Hectare
- No. of berths: 16

Statistics
- Annual container volume: 10 million TEU (2013)
- Website www.yict.com.cn

Yantian International Container Terminal is a deep water port in Shenzhen, Guangdong, China. It specializes in handling containers of all sorts from feeders to very large container ships.

== Description ==
The approach channel leading to YICT is 400 meters wide and 17.4 meters deep and is only two kilometers away from the public waterway. It has a total waterfront length of eight kilometers, a yard area of 373 hectares, and 16 deep-water container berths. It is equipped with over 70 quay cranes; the majority of which are Super Post-Panamax.

== See also ==
- Ports in China
