= COSCO Shipping Energy =

Chinese shipping company

COSCO SHIPPING Energy Transportation Co., Ltd.
- Formerly: Shanghai Haixing Shipping Co., Ltd.; China Shipping Development Co., Ltd.
- Company type: public
- Traded as: SEHK: 1138; SSE: 600026
- Industry: Shipping
- Founded: 1994
- Headquarters: Shanghai, China
- Area served: Worldwide
- Key people: Chairman: Mr. Liu Hanbo
- Products: Oil shipping
- Owner: COSCO Shipping (via China Shipping Group)
- Parent: China Shipping Group

Chinese name
- Simplified Chinese: 中远海运能源运输股份有限公司
- Traditional Chinese: 中遠海運能源運輸股份有限公司
- Hanyu Pinyin: Zhōngyuǎn hǎiyùn néngyuán yùnshū gǔfèn yǒuxiàn gōngsī
Transcriptions
Standard Mandarin
- Hanyu Pinyin: Zhōngyuǎn hǎiyùn néngyuán yùnshū gǔfèn yǒuxiàn gōngsī

former name
- Simplified Chinese: 中海发展股份有限公司
- Traditional Chinese: 中海發展股份有限公司
- Hanyu Pinyin: Zhōnghǎi fāzhǎn gǔfèn yǒuxiàn gōngsī
Transcriptions
Standard Mandarin
- Hanyu Pinyin: Zhōnghǎi fāzhǎn gǔfèn yǒuxiàn gōngsī

short name
- Simplified Chinese: 中远海能
- Traditional Chinese: 中遠海能
- Hanyu Pinyin: Zhōng-yuǎn hǎi-néng
Transcriptions
Standard Mandarin
- Hanyu Pinyin: Zhōng-yuǎn hǎi-néng

former short name
- Simplified Chinese: 中海发展
- Traditional Chinese: 中海發展
- Hanyu Pinyin: Zhōnghǎi fāzhǎn
Transcriptions
Standard Mandarin
- Hanyu Pinyin: Zhōnghǎi fāzhǎn
- Website: en.energy.coscoshipping.com

COSCO Shipping Energy Transportation Co., Ltd., stylized as COSCO SHIPPING Energy, is a Chinese oil tanker shipping company with its headquarters in Hongkou District, Shanghai. The company transports crude oil, LNG, and LPG. It is a subsidiary of COSCO Shipping. It is the world's largest oil tanker shipping company in terms of fleet capacity.

== History ==
The company was established by Shanghai Shipping Group as Shanghai Haixing Shipping Co., Ltd in May 1994. Haixing Shipping issued 1.08 billion H shares and was listed on the Stock Exchange of Hong Kong (SEHK) in November 1994. It quickly became the largest carrier of coal and crude in East China.

On July 1, 1997, China Shipping Group was founded in Shanghai to hold all the shares of Haixing Shipping's parent, Shanghai Shipping Group, along with the shares of Guangzhou Shipping Group and Dalian Shipping Group. On July 18, 1997, China Shipping agreed to acquire all the "legal person shares" (Chinese: 法人股; Chinese regulatory terminology) of Haixing Shipping from Shanghai Shipping Group. As a result, China Shipping Group became the controlling shareholder of Haixing Shipping. In December 1997, Haixing Shipping changed its name to China Shipping Development Co. Ltd.

The main business focus of China Shipping Development was bulk cargo shipping, specifically oil shipping. In 2006, the company acquired 42 bulk carrier ships and became one of the largest oil shipping companies in the Far East. In 2007, the company ordered 16 VLOC ships to transport iron ore imports. In 2009, China Shipping Development acquired China Shipping LNG Investment Company Limited from China Shipping Group. Then, China Shipping Development along with MOL established joint ventures with Sinopec and PetroChina to transport LNG. The joint venture companies ordered a total of 10 LNG vessels in July 2011 and April 2013, of which 6 vessels are owned by China Shipping Development.

In August 2012, China Shipping Development established a subsidiary, China Shipping Bulk Carrier Company Limited, to handle all its dry bulk business.

In 2016, China Shipping Development's parent company, China Shipping Group, completed a merger with COSCO Group. As part of the merger China Shipping Development sold 100% equity interest of its subsidiary China Shipping Bulk Carrier Co. to the newly formed China COSCO Bulk Shipping Co. Meanwhile, China Shipping Development acquired 100% equity interest of tanker shipping company Dalian Ocean Shipping Co. from COSCO Group. As a result, China Shipping Development was renamed to COSCO SHIPPING Energy Transportation, and became focused solely on oil and LNG shipping.

COSCO SHIPPING Energy became the world's largest oil tanker fleet, with 105 oil tanker ships totaling 17.04 million DWT.

== See also ==
- Chinese shipping
