= International Dockworkers Council =

The International Dockworkers Council (IDC) is an association formed by organizations of dockworkers from around the world.

The IDC was officially founded on 27 June 2000, in Santa Cruz de Tenerife, Canary Islands.
