= Chong Hing Bank =

Hong Kong-based bank

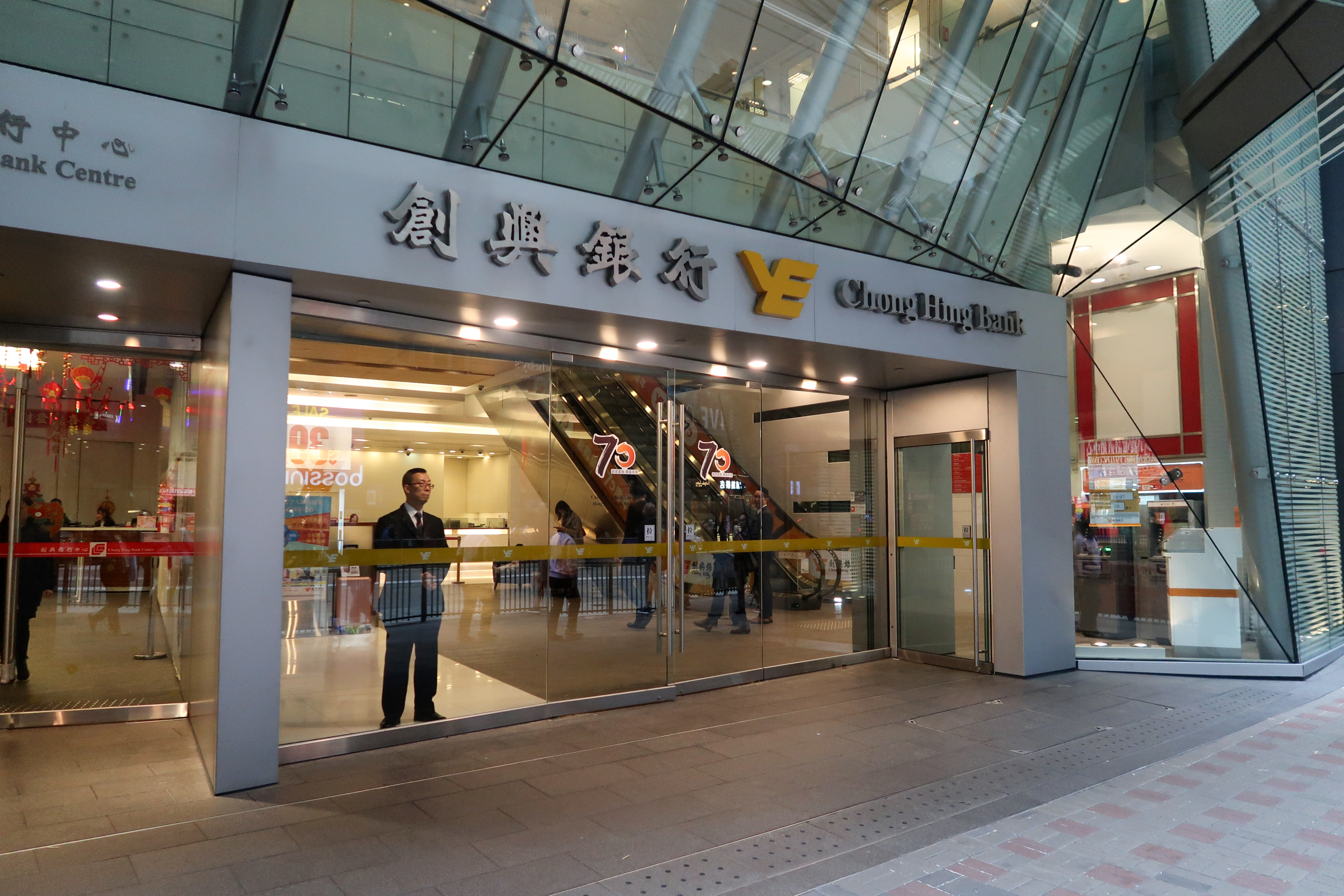
- Chong Hing Bank headquarters
- Formerly: Liu Chong Hing Bank
- Type: Private
- Industry: Financial services
- Founded: 1948; 78 years ago
- Founder: Liu family
- Headquarters: 24 Des Voeux Road Central, Central, Hong Kong
- Key people: Zhang Zhaoxing (Chairman); Zong Jianxin (Deputy Chairman and Chief Executive); Lau Wai Man (Deputy Chief Executive)

Chinese name
- Traditional Chinese: 創興銀行
- Simplified Chinese: 创兴银行
Transcriptions
Standard Mandarin
- Hanyu Pinyin: Chuàngxīng Yínháng
Yue: Cantonese
- Yale Romanization: chong hīng ngàhn hòhng
- Jyutping: cong^{3} hing^{1} ngan^{4} hong^{4}
- Website: chbank.com

Chong Hing Bank is a bank founded in Hong Kong in 1948. It is headquartered in Central, while the back offices are located in Western District and Mong Kok. It was owned by the Liu family of Hong Kong until it was acquired by the Chinese state-owned Yue Xiu Group in 2014.

== History ==
The bank was founded as Liu Chong Hing Bank in Hong Kong in 1948 by Liu Po-shan (廖寶珊), who migrated to Hong Kong from Chiuchow shortly before the Japanese occupation of the territory began in 1942. He entered the property business and subsequently banking in 1948, working from an office on Wing Lok Street in Western. In 1955 the company became a savings bank with branches.

It suffered a bank run for several days from 14 June 1961, which managing director Liu Po-sang blamed on "malicious rumours by rivals". The rumours said that the bank was under police investigation. The panic partially subsided by 17 June 1961 after the Hong Kong Police affirmed that there was no such investigation and after the Chartered Bank and the Hongkong and Shanghai Banking Corporation released a joint statement attesting to the bank's integrity. Some of Liu's sons – including Liu Lit-mo, Liu Lit-man, and Liu Lit-for – helped the bank weather the crisis. The elder Liu died on 23 July 1961 at the age of 61.

In 1972, the bank had nine branches and assets of HK$372 million. It had grown to 19 branches by 1978. Liu Chong Hing Bank was spun off from its parent Liu Chong Hing Investment in 1994. The Liu family is split up into three groups, each group under the main figures in the company.

From 1997 to 2007, COSCO Pacific was a minority shareholder (20%) of the bank. From 2007, the stake was owned by COSCO Pacific's parent company, COSCO HK.

On 29 November 2006, the shareholders of the Liu Chong Hing Bank agreed to change the name of the bank to Chong Hing Bank Limited effective 23 December 2006, to decrease the family business image of the bank.

In 2013, it was announced that Chong Hing Bank would be acquired by the Chinese state-owned Yue Xiu Group, the investment arm of the Guangzhou municipal government.

The acquisition was completed on 14 February 2014. Yue Xiu Financial Holdings Limited (wholly owned by Guangzhou Yue Xiu Holdings Limited) now owns 75 per cent of the Chong Hing Bank. The bank dropped its previous logo, a stylised red "CH", which stood for Chong Hing. In its place it adopted the logo of Yue Xiu, a golden ligature of the letters "YE", which stand for Yue Xiu Group and the word "excellent", respectively.

Margaret Leung was replaced as CEO by Zong Jianxin (宗建新) on 19 April 2017.

In 2021, Chong Hing Bank was privatized and delisted from the Hong Kong Stock Exchange.

== Branches ==
The main branch is located on Des Voeux Road Central in Central, Hong Kong. As of March 2018, the bank has nine branches on Hong Kong Island, 16 in Kowloon, and 14 branches in the New Territories – bringing the total number of branches in Hong Kong to 39. It also has a small number of locations in China as well as an office in San Francisco.
