= China Shipping Group =

Shanghai-based maritime logistics firm

China Shipping Group Company
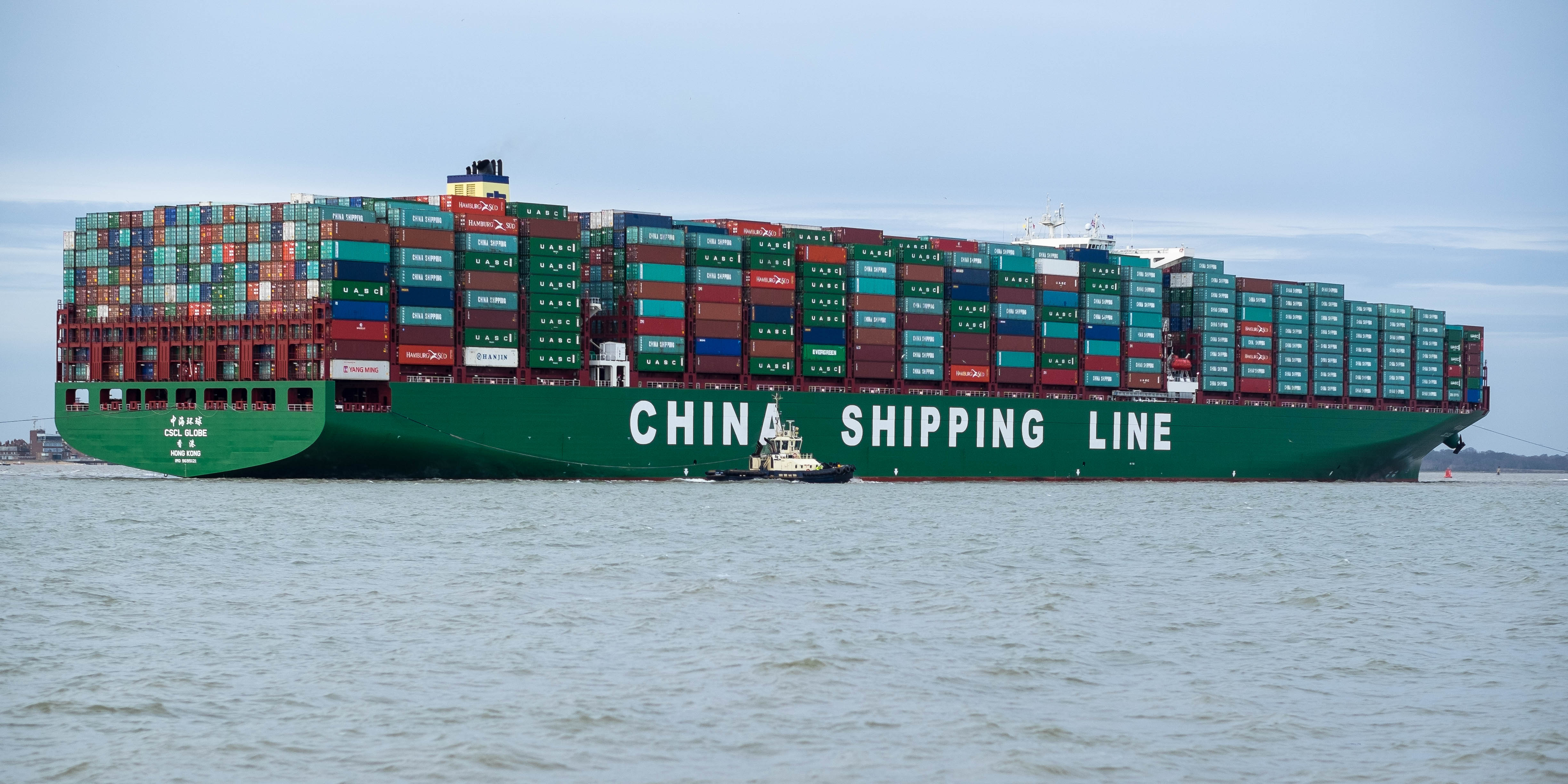
- China Shipping's container ship
- Native name: 中国海运集团有限公司
- Formerly: China Shipping (Group) Company
- Company type: Subsidiary
- Industry: Shipping and logistics
- Founded: 1997; 29 years ago
- Founder: Chinese Government; Li Kelin (founding president)
- Defunct: 2016 (as a company)
- Fate: Merged with COSCO Group; became a subsidiary of China COSCO Shipping
- Headquarters: Shanghai, China
- Area served: China
- Owner: China COSCO Shipping (100%)
- Parent: China COSCO Shipping
- Subsidiaries: COSCO Shipping Development
- Website: cnshipping.com (archived)

China Shipping Group
- Simplified Chinese: 中国海运集团有限公司
- Traditional Chinese: 中國海運集團有限公司
- Hanyu Pinyin: Zhōngguó hǎiyùn jítuán yǒuxiàn gōngsī
Transcriptions
Standard Mandarin
- Hanyu Pinyin: Zhōngguó hǎiyùn jítuán yǒuxiàn gōngsī

former name
- Simplified Chinese: 中国海运（集团）总公司
- Traditional Chinese: 中國海運（集團）總公司
- Hanyu Pinyin: Zhōngguó hǎiyùn (jítuán) zǒng gōngsī
Transcriptions
Standard Mandarin
- Hanyu Pinyin: Zhōngguó hǎiyùn (jítuán) zǒng gōngsī

short name
- Simplified Chinese: 中国海运
- Traditional Chinese: 中國海運
- Hanyu Pinyin: Zhōngguó hǎiyùn
Transcriptions
Standard Mandarin
- Hanyu Pinyin: Zhōngguó hǎiyùn

alternative short name
- Simplified Chinese: 中海集团
- Traditional Chinese: 中海集團
- Hanyu Pinyin: Zhōnghǎi jítuán
Transcriptions
Standard Mandarin
- Hanyu Pinyin: Zhōnghǎi jítuán

China Shipping Group Company was a former shipping corporation from 1997 to 2016, owned by the State Council of China and supervised by the State-owned Assets Supervision and Administration Commission of the State Council. The company merged with China Ocean Shipping Company to form China COSCO Shipping Corporation in January 2016.

China Shipping Group was mainly engaged in shipping of oil tankers, passenger ships and container vessels. Other related businesses included ship and Terminal management, finance and investment, engineering, human resources, trading and information technology.

== History ==
China Shipping Group Company was formed in 1997 by a merger of three Chinese Government owned shipping conglomerates, based in Shanghai, Guangzhou and Dalian respectively. At first the company had a net loss of RMB 680 million (in yuan) a year. The merger also made China Shipping Group became the new parent company of Hong Kong listed company China Shipping Development, at that time known as Haixing Shipping. Haixing Shipping was listed since 1994. China Shipping Group sold 19 oil tankers to the aforementioned listed subsidiary in 1998, for cash and A share.

In 2000, China Shipping Group formed a new land based logistics company, China Shipping Logistics Co. (CSLC), with other fellow Chinese Government owned companies. China Shipping Group's listed subsidiary, China Shipping Development, also purchased a small stake.

In 2001, China Shipping Group bought 50% stake of China Shipping (North America) Agency from Norton Lilly International, a shipping agent. In 2002, China Shipping Group, via the subsidiary, China Shipping Container Lines, placed orders on new container ships. The deal was partnered with fellow Government owned company (and future sister company), China Ocean Shipping (Group) Corporation (COSCO Group) and worth more than US$700 million.

In 2003, China Shipping Container Lines, introduced their second shipping route between China and northern Europe.

In 2005, via a subsidiary, China Shipping Group invested in a terminal of the Port of Tianjin.

In 2008, China Shipping Group announced that to form a joint venture with fellow Chinese Government owned China National Coal Group on shipping coals.

=== IPOs ===
In 2004, the Group listed the subsidiary, China Shipping Container Lines in the Stock Exchange of Hong Kong (SEHK) by issuing H shares. In 2007, the listed subsidiary floats its A share in the Shanghai Stock Exchange (SSE).

In 2007, China Shipping Group injected assets to another listed subsidiary of the group, China Shipping Haisheng (Chinese: 中海海盛), which is listed in SSE. However, China Shipping Group sold China Shipping Haisheng in August 2015. but bought back some business in August 2016 to complete the selling of the listed company as a vehicle of backdoor listing.

The Group has yet another subsidiary that listed in Shenzhen Stock Exchange (SZSE), which formerly known as China Shipping Network Technology.

In 2011, yet another subsidiary, China Shipping Nauticgreen was planned to be listed in the SEHK. However, it was cancelled in August 2011.

=== Mergers ===
In 2010, fellow Central Government owned conglomerate, Shanghai Ship and Shipping Research Institute (SSSRI), became a wholly owned subsidiary of China Shipping Group.

In December 2015 the China Shipping Group announced a merger with its larger government-owned compatriot, China Ocean Shipping (Group) Corporation (COSCO Group). The merger was completed in February 2016; producing the mega-entity China COSCO Shipping, to be headquartered in Shanghai. The businesses and subsidiaries of both China Shipping and COSCO were integrated into one conglomerate. The merger was triggered by a downturn in the container and marine shipping industry that stymied the financial health of both China Shipping and COSCO, thus motivating the two to unite and endure the decline together. Additionally, the merger is attributable to China's State-owned enterprise reform.

China Shipping Group was retained as an intermediate holding company, but disappeared as the brand of the combined group.

In 2017, China Shipping (Group) Company was reincorporated from "An industrial enterprise owned by the whole people" to simply a limited company. The name of the company, also changed to China Shipping Group Company, Limited (Chinese: 中国海运集团有限公司).

== Subsidiaries ==
As of December 2019, former China Shipping Group listed subsidiaries, China Shipping Development, China Shipping Container Lines, China Shipping Network Technology and China Shipping Haisheng, are known as COSCO Shipping Energy Transportation (or simply, COSCO Shipping Energy), COSCO Shipping Development, COSCO Shipping Technology and Lanhai Medical Investment (Chinese: 览海医疗) respectively. As of December 2019, China Shipping Group, also owned 38.56% shares of COSCO Shipping Energy and 38.41% shares of COSCO Shipping Development respectively, as the largest shareholders and controlling shareholders. China Shipping Group is not a shareholder of Lanhai Medical Investment anymore since August 2015.

China Shipping Container Lines engaged in container shipping line but after renaming to COSCO Shipping Development, engaged in leasing container and vessels only. While China Shipping Development, now COSCO Shipping Energy Transportation, engaged in oil tanker business.

=== Shanghai Ship and Shipping Research Institute ===
As of December 2019, China Shipping Group is the direct parent company of Shanghai Ship and Shipping Research Institute (SSSRI), which in turn owned 50.01% shares of aforementioned COSCO Shipping Technology.

SSSRI conducts research and development into ship design. In 2017, SSSRI order an equipment from HR Wallingford, worth £12 million. According to the institute, it was founded in 1962 and became part of China Shipping Group in 2010. From 2003 to 2010 it was supervised by State-owned Assets Supervision and Administration Commission (SASAC) of the State Council directly.

In 2007, SSSRI formed a joint venture, Underwater Security Guard Engineering Center, with Institute of Acoustics, Chinese Academy of Sciences (IACAS).

SSSRI completed a design of a record-breaking 25,000 TEU ship in 2019.

=== China Shipping Nauticgreen ===
As of 2011, China Shipping Nauticgreen Holdings Co., Ltd. was a subsidiary of China Shipping Group. It was a shipping container leasing company. In the eve of its planned IPO in 2011, the largest customer was sister company China Shipping Container Lines, for a reported 24.6% revenue. The suppliers of China Shipping Nauticgreen, Dong Fang (Guangzhou), Dong Fang (Jinzhou) and Dong Fang (Lianyungang), were all controlled by the parent company China Shipping Group.

After the failed IPO in 2011 and the merger of the parent company, China Shipping Group, with China Ocean Shipping (Group) Corporation (COSCO Group) in 2015, the container and vessel leasing business of China Shipping Group, was purchased by China Shipping Container Lines instead, while China Shipping Container Lines sold their container line business to other sister company of the enlarged group. The complex intra group re-organization that involves multiple listed subsidiaries, saw Oriental Fleet International (new name of China Shipping Nauticgreen) and other companies of that container and vessel leasing business division, were sold to China Shipping Container Lines.

As of 2019, COSCO Shipping Development (former China Shipping Container Lines), still purchased RMB1.251 billion worth of containers from its parent China COSCO Shipping group, which includes China Shipping Group in the definition of Hong Kong listing rule for connected transaction.
