= Port of Wuhan =

Coordinates: 30°38′38″N 114°20′45″E

Port of Wuhan 武汉港
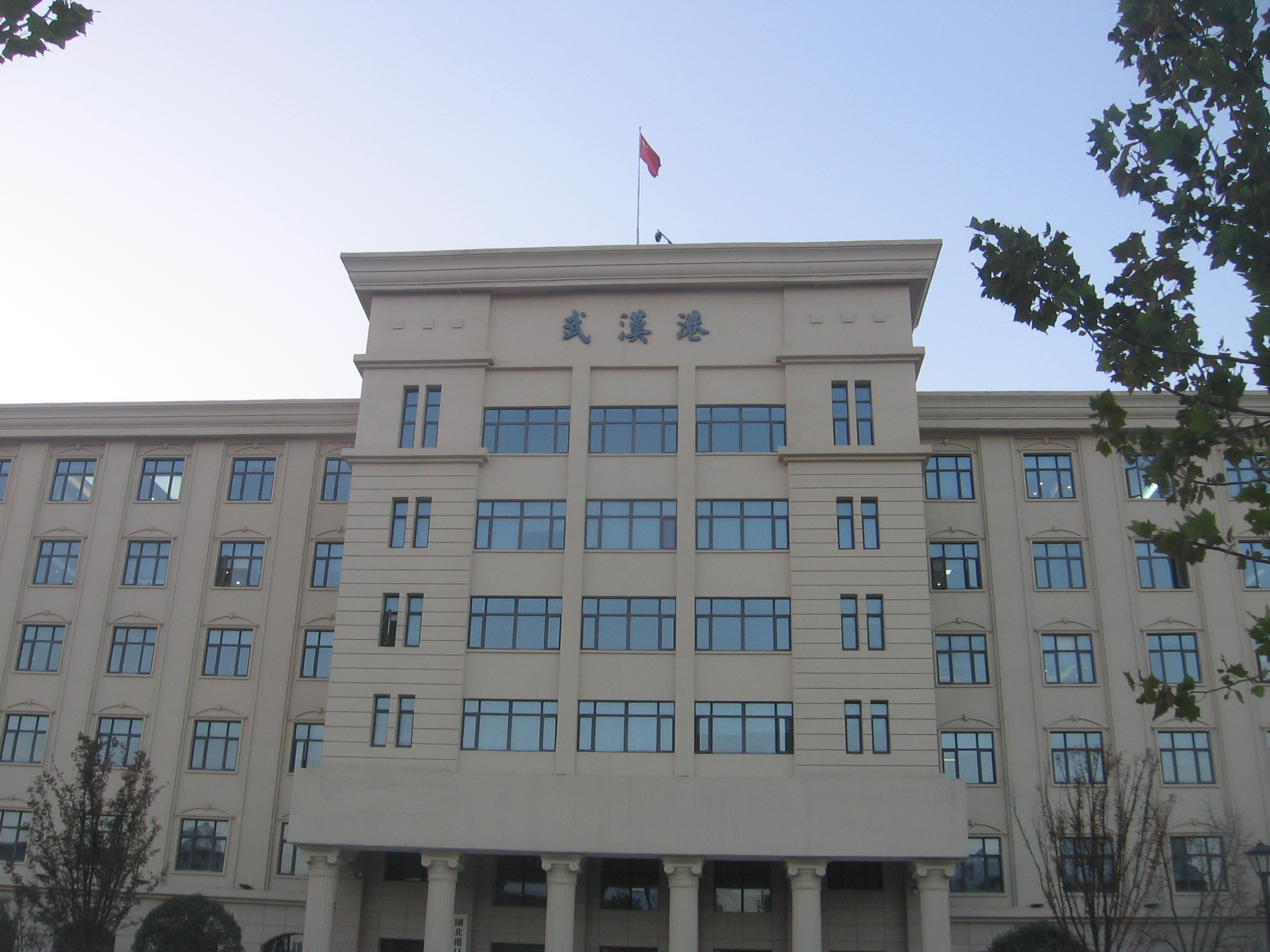
- Interactive map of Port of Wuhan 武汉港

Location
- Country: People's Republic of China
- Location: Wuhan, Hubei Province

Details
- Type of harbour: Natural River Inland Port

Statistics
- Website; Port of Wuhan website

The Port of Wuhan is the natural river port of the sub-provincial city of Wuhan, Hubei Province, People's Republic of China. The port lies at the confluence of the Yangtze and Hanjiang rivers. It is able to handle ocean-going ships of 10,000 DWT. In 2013, it had a throughput of 42.2 million tons of cargo, and 513,229 TEU of containers.

== History ==
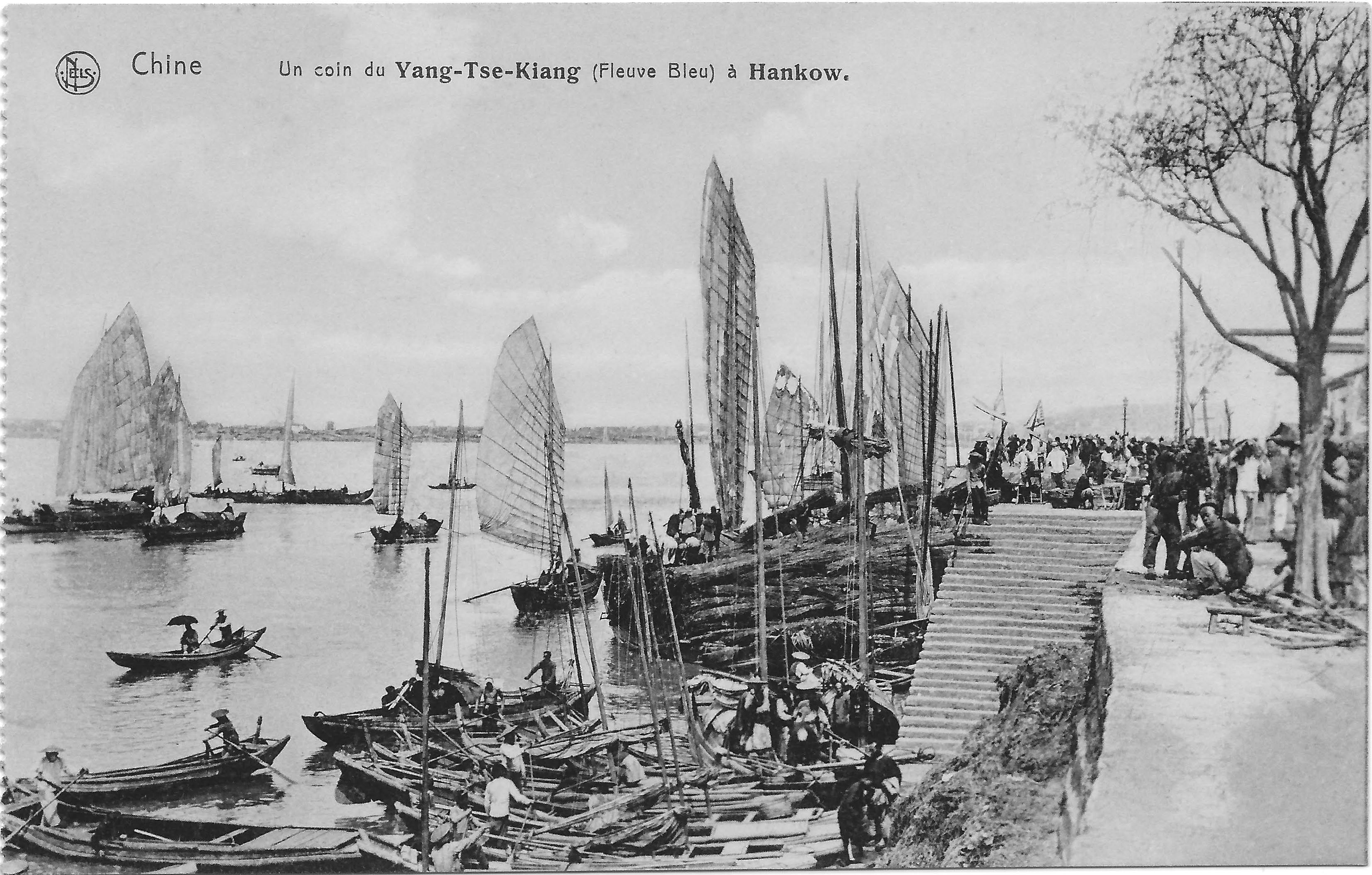
The Yangztze waterfront in the old Hankou

Hankou was one of the Treaty Ports opened by the Treaties of Tientsin in 1858.

== Layout ==
The Port of Wuhan is located on the shores of the Yangtze and Hanjiang rivers. The river channel is 10m deep during the wet season. As of 2012 the WHPG had 51 production berths, 122.45 km^{2} of port areas, 7,579m of quayside, 43.4 ha of warehouses. Including all other minor operators, the port had 244 berths.

As of 2012, Wuhan Port had 24 port areas, of which 9 were the main Port Areas:

- Jinkou Heavy Lift Cargo Port Area (金口重件港区)
- Tunkou Vehicles and Oil Port Area (沌口汽车与油品港区)
- Hanyang Container and Bulk Cargo Area (汉阳集装箱与散杂货港区)
- Hankou Tourist and Passengers Port Area (汉口旅游客运港区)
- Qingshan Ore and Steel Port Area (青山矿石与4港)
- Zuoling Dangerous Chemicals Port Area (左岭危化品港区)
- Yangluo Container Port Area (阳逻集装箱港区)
- Huashan Container Port Area (花山集装箱港区)
- Linsifang Coal Port Area (林四房煤炭港区): Under planning

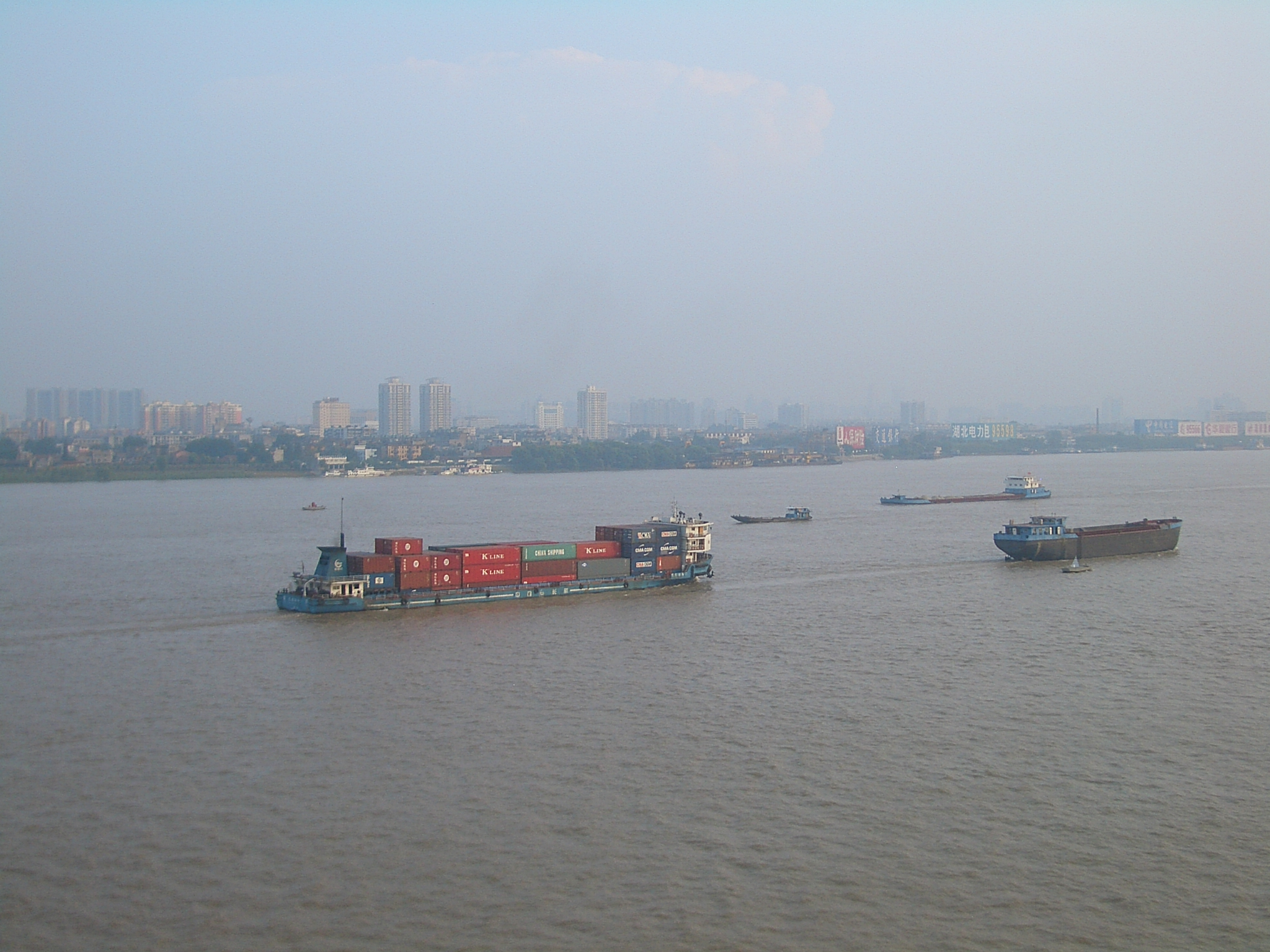
Cargo vessels on the Yangtze in Wuhan (2009)

The planned reorganization of the port would create 15 port areas by 2020:

- Hannan Port Area (汉南港区)
  - Dengnan Operations Area (邓南作业区) Dry bulk cargo, general cargo, Ro-ro vehicles
  - Shamao Operations Area (纱帽作业区) Ro-ro vehicles, bulk cargo and general cargo.
- Junshan Port Area (军山港区): Ro-ro vehicles and general cargo.
- Tunkou Port Area (沌口港区) Ro-ro vehicles, clean cargo and urban supplies.
- Yangsi Port Area (杨泗港区) Tourism and passengers
- Wuhu Port Area (武湖港区) general cargo, oil and liquid chemicals.
- Yangluo Port Area (阳逻港区) Core of the port and focus of development. Containers.
- Linsifang Port Area (林四房港区) Coal transshipment
- Jiangxia Port Area (江夏港区) Dry bulk and ro-ro vehicles.
- Qingling Port Area (青菱港区) Clean cargo and urban supplies
- Qingshan Port Area (青山港区) Retain current functions
- Baihushan Port Area (白浒山港区) Containers, oil and liquid chemicals
- Qingfeng Port Area (青锋港区) Serving the Wujiashan Technology Economic Development Area. Hanjiang River
- Duoluokou Port Area (舵落口港区) General cargo and urban supplies. Hanjiang river
- Caidian Port Area (蔡甸港区) Retain current functions. Hanjiang river.
- Yongantang Port Area (永安堂港区) Preserve current functions. Hanjiang river.

By 2030, the plan is for the port to have 422 production berths and a capacity of 251 million tonnes per annum.

== Administration ==
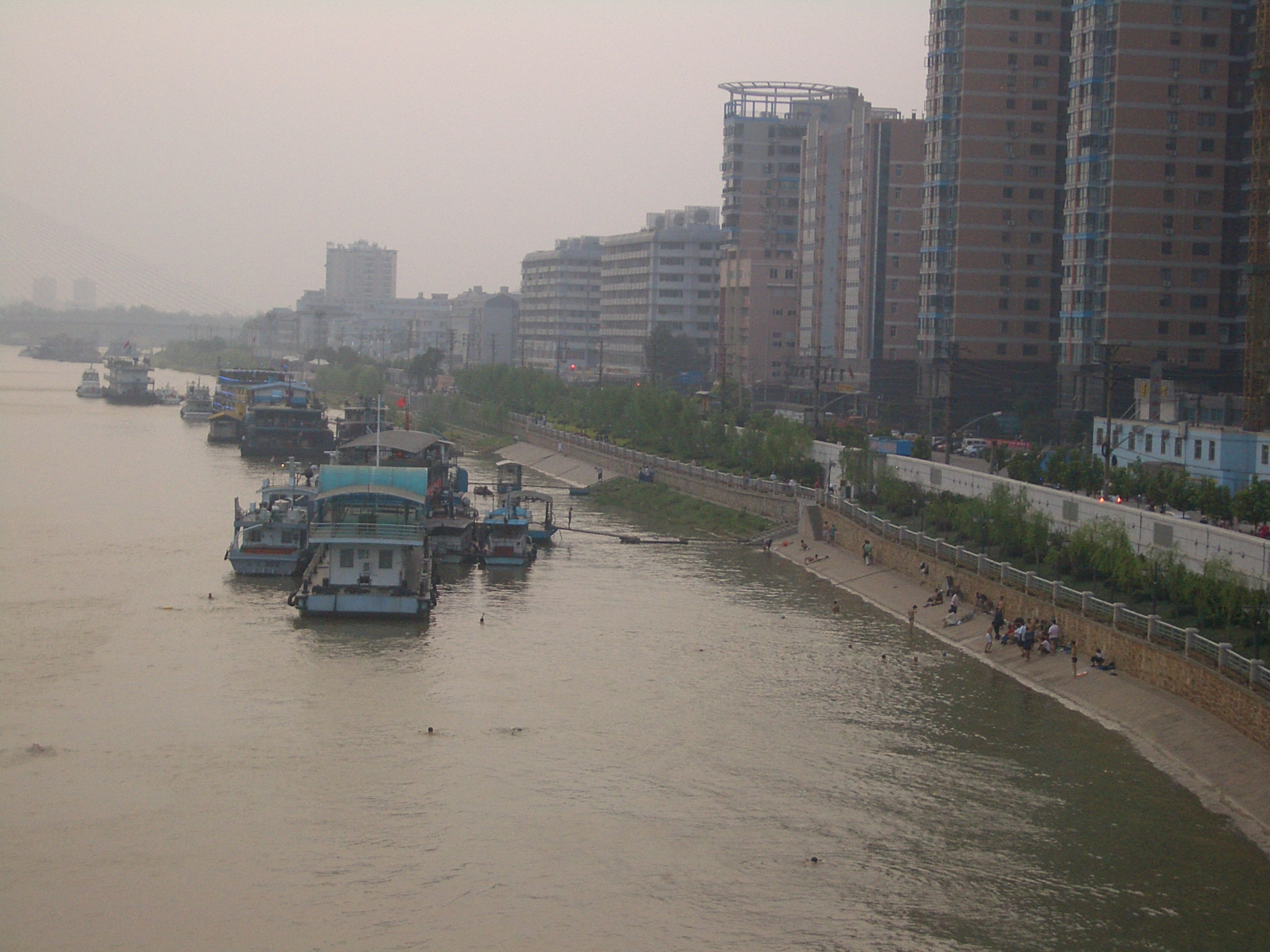
Docks on the Han River in Wuhan

The Port of Wuhan is mainly operated by the Wuhan Port Group Co., Ltd. (武汉港务集团有限公司)

== Operations ==
The Port has 20.9 km of internal railways, and like other ports on the Yangtze, it is trying to increase its intermodal capabilities. 318 units of cargo handling equipment.

Anchorages can hold 700,000 DWT of shipping.

The Port Group has 140 workboats, including tugboats and barges.
