= Sino-Ocean Group =

Chinese real estate company

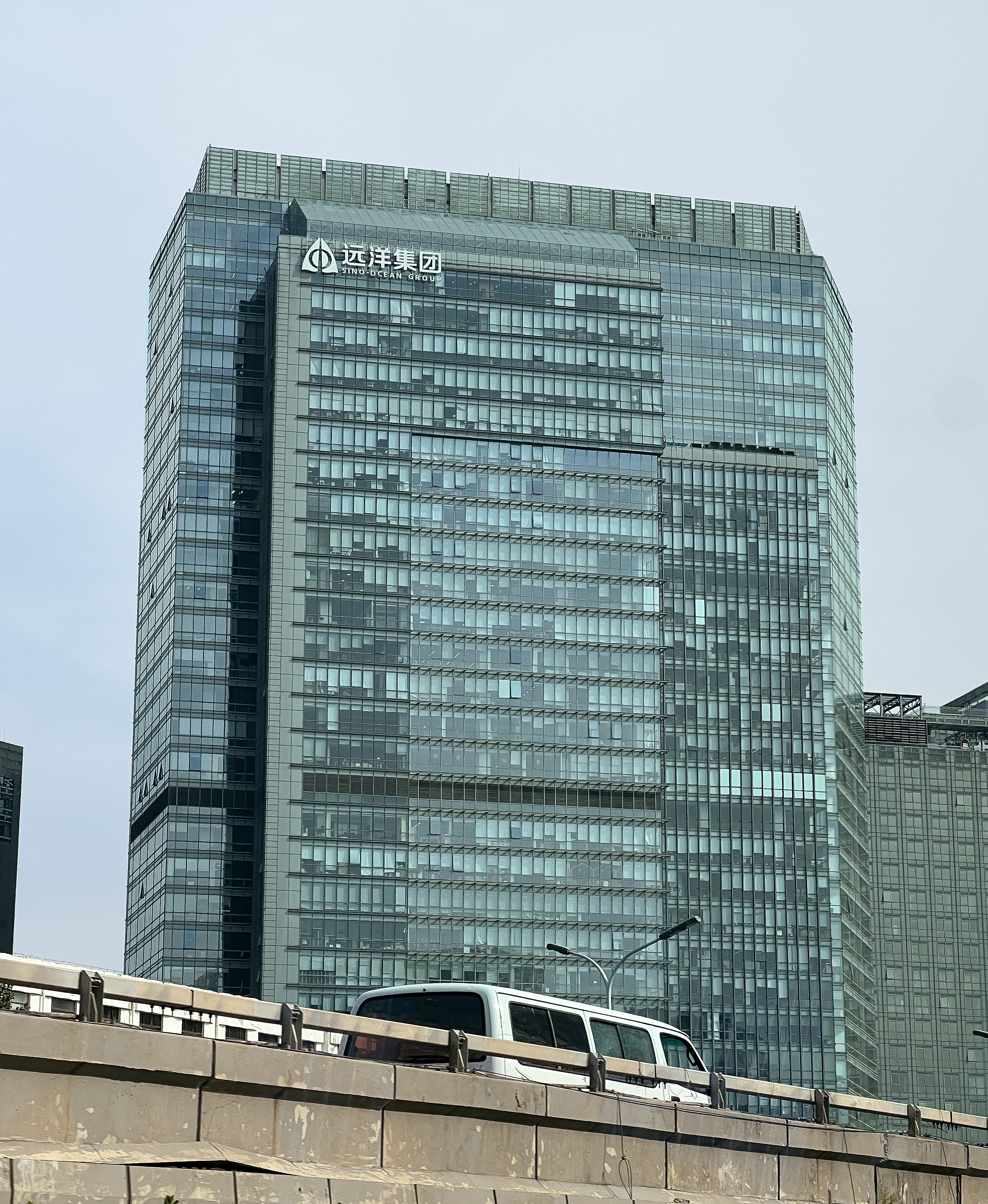
- Headquarters
- Native name: 远洋集团控股有限公司
- Formerly: Sino-Ocean Land
- Type: Public
- Traded as: SEHK: 3377
- Industry: Real estate
- Founded: 1993
- Headquarters: 32nd FL, Tower A, Sino Ocean International Center, 56 East 4th Ring Middle Road, Chaoyang District, Beijing, China
- Area served: China
- Key people: Chairman: Li Ming (李明)
- Revenue: US$7 billion (2023)
- Net income: -US$2.3 billion (2023)
- Number of employees: 13,428 (2023)
- Website: www.sinooceangroup.com

Sino-Ocean Group Holding Limited (Chinese: 远洋集团控股有限公司) is a Chinese investment holding company that engages in the property investment and development activities. The company develops real estate projects such as mid to high-end residential properties and also invests in and operates urban complexes, office buildings.

It also provides property management. For instance, its service includes community O2O, and equity investment. In addition, the company is involved in the logistic property, real estate financing, pension, real estate fund, and environmental technology businesses.

The company was formerly known as Sino-Ocean Land Holdings Limited and changed its name to Sino-Ocean Group Holding Limited in May 2016.

== See also ==
- Real estate in China
