= Shipping industry of China =

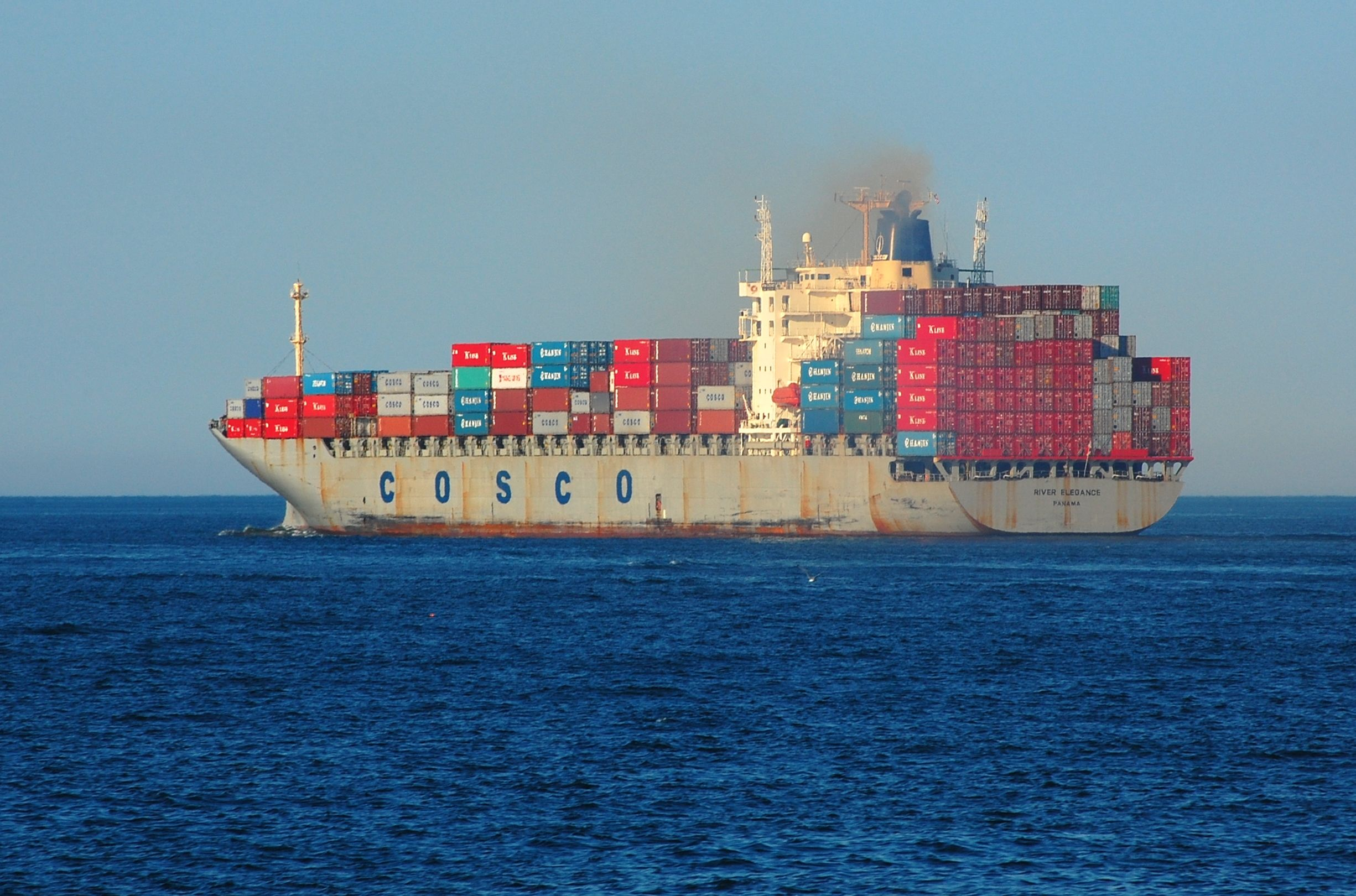
A COSCO container ship sails from Boston Harbor.

In 1961 China established a state-run maritime shipping company and subsequently signed shipping agreements with many countries, laying the foundation for developing the country's ocean transport. That organization developed into the present-day China Ocean Shipping (Group) Company (COSCO). The Chinese government also invested heavily in water transport infrastructure, constructing new ports and rebuilding and enlarging older facilities.

A major effort has also been made to increase mechanization and containerization at major international ports.

China's shipping industry and container transportation have reached international standards both in handling efficiency and building networks.

The governmental responsibility of the shipping industry is under the Ministry of Transport.

The number of container units handled by Chinese ports in 2011 reached more than 150 million. The country also manufactures 90% of the world's containers.

The throughput of cargo and containers at China's ports has been the largest in the world for the past five years, with an annual growth rate of 35%.

== History ==
The development of China's shipping industry began in 1961 with the establishment of a state-run maritime shipping company. The first significant milestone occurred in September 1973, when the country received its first overseas container at Tianjin Port. This event marked the beginning of containerized shipping in China, leading to the creation of the first container berth in 1980.

During the 1990s, the industry experienced rapid growth, with China surpassing the United States in 2002 to become the world's largest handler of containers. By 2006, the country managed 5.6 billion tons of cargo and 93 million TEUs (20-foot container equivalent units). The Port of Shanghai emerged as the world's busiest port, handling 530 million tons of cargo annually.

Water transportation has played a crucial role in China's foreign trade, accounting for over 90% of cargo delivery. This includes 95% of imported crude oil and 99% of imported iron ore. The strategic development of container shipping has further integrated China's inland regions into the global market, creating a seamless connection between coastal ports and inland waterways.

== Geography ==
China's extensive coastline stretches over 14,000 kilometers (8,700-mile), featuring 100 bays and 20 deepwater harbors, most of which remain ice-free year-round. The country's coastal shipping network is divided into two principal zones: the northern and southern marine districts. The northern district, administered from Shanghai, extends from Xiamen to the North Korean border. The southern district, with Guangzhou as its administrative center, covers the area from Xiamen to the Vietnamese border.

Major ocean-going routes originate from key ports such as Dalian, Qinghuangdao, Tianjin, Qingdao, Shanghai, Huangpu, Zhanjiang, or Hong Kong.

Shanghai, historically the leading port of China, was briefly eclipsed by Hong Kong following its reintegration into China in 1997.

== Yangtze River Hu-Yu Route ==
On June 23, 2007, renovations on the section of the Yangtze River between Luzhou and Chongqing, also known as the Hu-Yu Sea Route, have been completed. These renovations mean that ships over a thousand tons can now arrive in Luzhou.

Before the renovations, the Hu-Yu Sea Route was unable to suitably support the shipping needs of the Sichuan economy. In October 2005, renovations started with a total investment of 120 million yuan (US$15.7 million). After two years of work, the Hu-Yu Route channel has been significantly enlarged to a depth of 2.7 meters and a width of 50 meters. The result is that vessels as large as 3000 tons can now navigate the Hu-Yu Sea Route.

== Greek forays ==
Greek firms have managed to capture the immense expansion of South East Asia and particularly Europe. Dry bulk shipping firms dealing in iron and coal have benefited from the development.

== Ports and canals ==
- List of ports in China
- Grand Canal (China)
- List of busiest container ports
- Lists of canals

== Companies ==
- China COSCO Shipping
  - China Ocean Shipping (Group) Company (COSCO)
    - COSCO Shipping Holdings
    - COSCO Shipping Ports
    - COSCO Shipping International
    - China International Marine Containers
  - China Shipping Group
    - China Shipping Container Lines
    - China Shipping Development
- China Merchants
  - China Merchants Holdings (International)
  - China Merchants Energy Shipping
- Sinotrans (Sinotrans Shipping)
- The China Navigation Company
- Orient Overseas Container Line
- Nan Fung Group
- Parakou Shipping

== See also ==
- Transport in China
- China Classification Society
- International Chamber of Shipping (ICS)
- Shipping portal
- Ship registration in Hong Kong
  - The Revolution of Ship Registration in Hong Kong
- List of maritime colleges
  - Shanghai Maritime University
  - Dalian Maritime University
