= Hong Kong shipping register =

The port of Hong Kong is a deep water port located in southern China. It is one of the hub ports serving the South-East and East Asia region, and is a gateway to mainland China. The city of Hong Kong began as a colony of the United Kingdom. It was a free port, and became an international trade center connecting land and sea transport between China and other countries. The port has mature infrastructure and well-developed air-sea-land transport. It helps Hong Kong maintain its position on international trade centre and transshipment hub.

As part of the 1997 transfer of sovereignty of Hong Kong from Britain to China, the ship registration system has made some adjustments. In 1990, the Marine Department set up a separate system for the Hong Kong Shipping Register. The ordinance of Hong Kong Ship Registration was amended accordingly.

== Adjustments ==
1 Name of Shipping Registry

By authorization of the Government of the People's Republic of China, the Hong Kong Shipping Register should follow the Basic Law by using the name 'Hong Kong, China" to maintain a separate ship registration system.

2 Ownership of Ship

For ship preparing to register in Hong Kong, the shipowner should authorize a local agent, who roles as the representative connected with Marine Department, so as to better manage fleet of ships directly.

3 Employment of Ship Crews

Under the new ship registration system, there are no nationality requirements for officers and crew who serve on Hong Kong registered ships. Crew size depends on the ship's size and nature. Ship officers must have respective certificates of competency issued by Hong Kong Marine Department in compliance with the STCW95 Convention.

4 Equipment of Registered Ships

Equipment should fulfill the requirements on safety and protection of marine environment ratified by International Maritime Organization (IMO). In addition, Shipowners should authorize classification societies to carry out statutory surveys and issue relevant certificates.

5 Preferential Charges

There are 3 types of charges: First Registration Fee, Annual Tonnage Charges (ATC) and Classification Society Charge. To encourage long term and stable registration, a First Registration Fee reduction scheme was put in place in April 1999. For ships not exceeding 500 Gross Tons (GT), the first registration fee is HK$3,500; ships exceeding 500GT, the fee is HK$15,000, much lower than the original charges of HK$100,000.

If a ship has no detention record under Port State Control (PSC) regime within 2 years, the registered ship receives a 6 month ATC reduction for the next year.

Hong Kong registered ships receive around 30% reduction in port dues in China ports since January 2000.

6 Taxation

Revenue generated from international trade including postage, passenger carriage and charter of ships can be exempted from the profits tax. Hong Kong participates in the Taxation Relief Agreement with 12 partner countries including the United States, China, United Kingdom, Germany, South Korea, Singapore, New Zealand, Netherland, Norway, Belgium, Denmark and Sri Lanka.

7 Quality Control System

Hong Kong Shipping Register introduced a quality control system in 1999. The system ensures that ship management companies perform inspection and survey on their ships. Since the Tokyo Memorandum of Understanding (MOU) in April 1994, Hong Kong has been on the Committee of Port State Control system. The detention rate of Hong Kong registered ships is lower than other Flag State countries.

== Summary ==
The new measures not only reduce the operation cost of ship management, but also improve service quality. The new system increased Hong Kong's competitive advantage for attracting more ships port. As of January 2009, Hong Kong registered ships have reached 40.56 million tons and over 1,380 vessels.
