= Port of Hong Kong =

Port in Hong Kong

Port of Hong Kong 香港港口
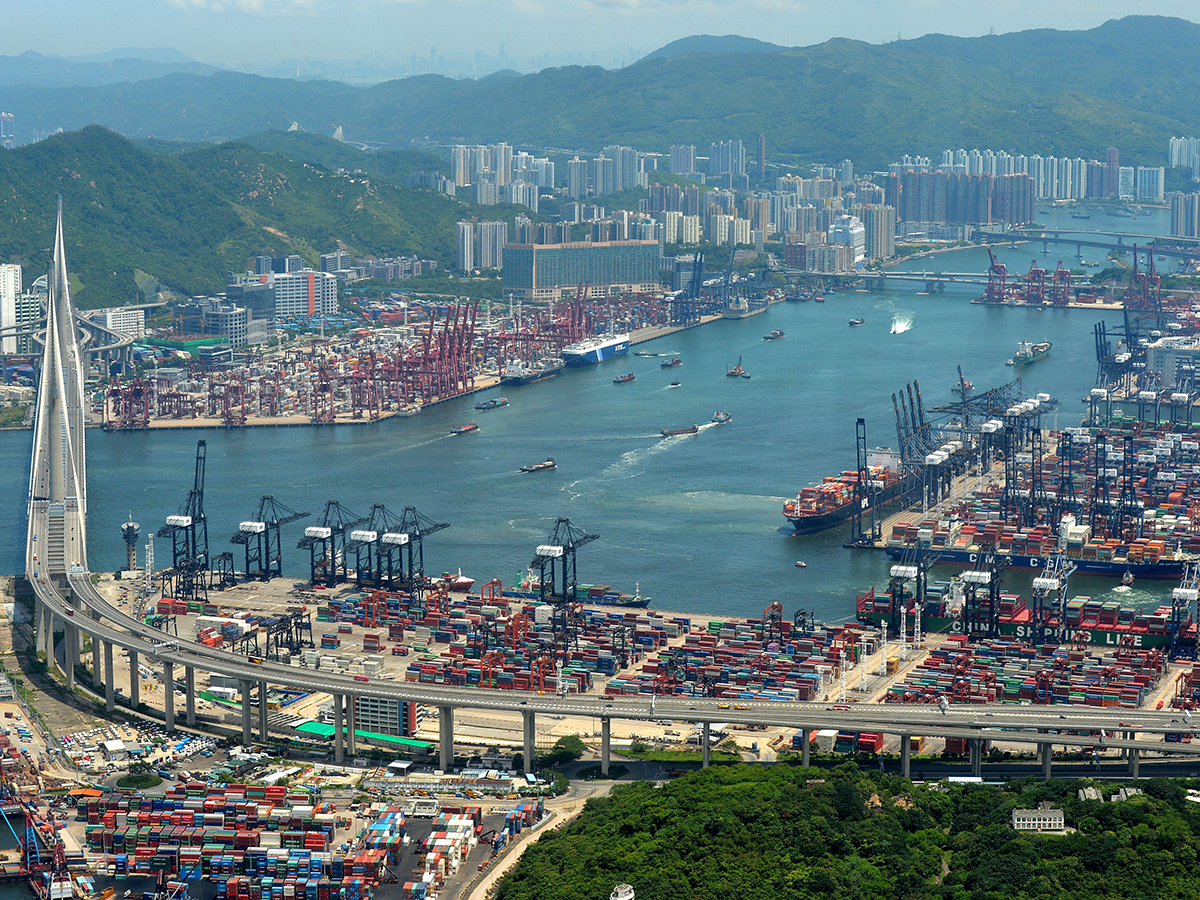
- Container terminals in Kwai Chung, Hong Kong, crossed by Stonecutters Bridge

- Location in China

Location
- Country: China
- Location: Hong Kong
- Coordinates: 22°20′N 114°8′E
- UN/LOCODE: HK KCO

Details
- Operated by: Hong Kong Maritime and Port Board
- Owned by: Government of Hong Kong
- Type of harbour: Natural deepwater seaport
- Land area: 279 hectares
- No. of berths: 24

Statistics
- Annual TEU: 18 million (2020)
- Website; Official website

The Port of Hong Kong located by the South China Sea, is a deepwater seaport dominated by trade in containerised manufactured products, and to a lesser extent raw materials and passengers. A key factor in the economic development of Hong Kong, the natural shelter and deep waters of Victoria Harbour provide ideal conditions for berthing and the handling of all types of vessels. It is one of the busiest ports in the world, in the three categories of shipping movements, cargo handled and passengers carried. This makes Hong Kong a Large-Port Metropolis.

== Administration ==
The responsibility for administering the port is vested in the Director of Marine. The Port Operations Committee advises the director on all matters in regards to the efficient operations of the port, except those matters that are the responsibility of the Pilotage Advisory Committee and the Provisional Local Vessels Advisory Committee. The Hong Kong Maritime and Port Board (HKMPB) advises the Government on matters related to port planning and development and promoting Hong Kong as a regional hub port and a leading container port in the world as well as on measures to further develop Hong Kong's maritime industry and to promote Hong Kong's position as an international maritime centre. The HKMPB replaced (in April 2016) the former Hong Kong Maritime Industry Council and Hong Kong Port Development Council and is chaired by the Secretary for Transport and Housing, as they both were.

The Marine Department is responsible for ensuring that conditions exist to enable ships to enter the port, work their cargoes and leave as quickly and as safely as possible. It is concerned with many aspects of safety standards for all classes and types of vessels, from the largest oil-carrying tankers to the smallest passenger-carrying sampans. It also maintains aids to navigation and mooring buoys for seagoing ships, manages three cross-boundary ferry terminals and administers eight public cargo working areas.

== Shipping ==
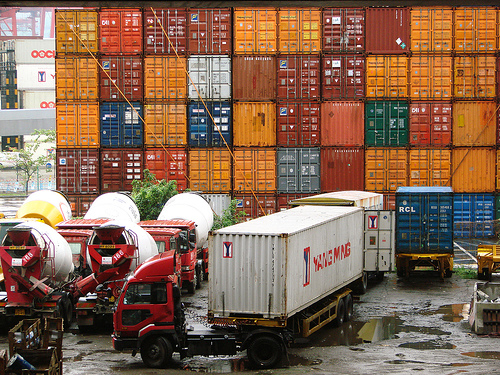
Container handling in Hong Kong

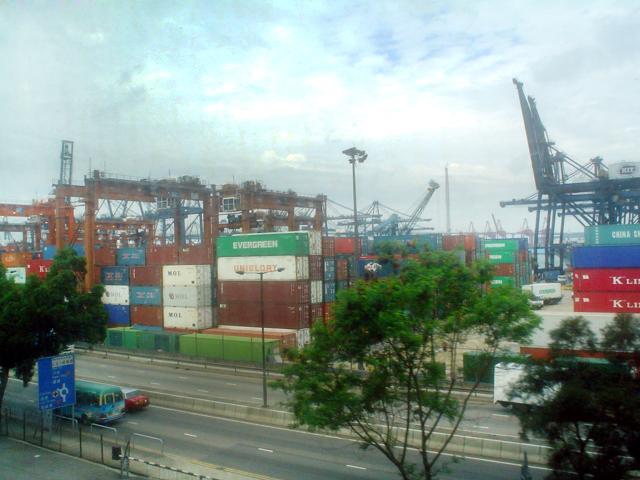
Kwai Tsing Container Terminals from the adjacent MTR line

Hong Kong is one of several hub ports serving the South-East and East Asia region, and is an economic gateway to mainland China. The port is part of the Maritime Silk Road that runs from the Chinese coast via the Suez Canal to the Mediterranean, there to the Upper Adriatic region of Trieste with its rail connections to Central and Eastern Europe.

Hong Kong set a record in its container throughput in 2007 by handling 23.9 million TEUs (20-foot equivalent units of containers), maintaining its status as the largest container port serving southern China and one of the busiest ports in the world. Some 456,000 vessels arrived in and departed from Hong Kong during the year, carrying 243 million tonnes of cargo and about 25 million passengers. The average turnaround time for container vessels in Hong Kong is about 10 hours. For conventional vessels working in mid-stream at buoys or anchorages, it is 42 and 52 hours respectively.

=== Container Port traffic ===
The port has been one of the busiest container ports in the world for many years, and at times the busiest. It was the world's busiest container port from 1987 to 1989, from 1992 to 1997, and from 1999 to 2004. The amount of container ships that went through Hong Kong's container port was 25,869 in 2016, with a net register tonnage of 386,853 tonnes in 2016.

=== Container terminals ===
There are currently nine container terminals situated at Kwai Chung, Stonecutters Island and Tsing Yi (the last one completed in 2004). Substantial container throughput is handled by the River Trade Terminal at Tuen Mun and by mid-stream.

==== Kwai Tsing Container Terminals ====
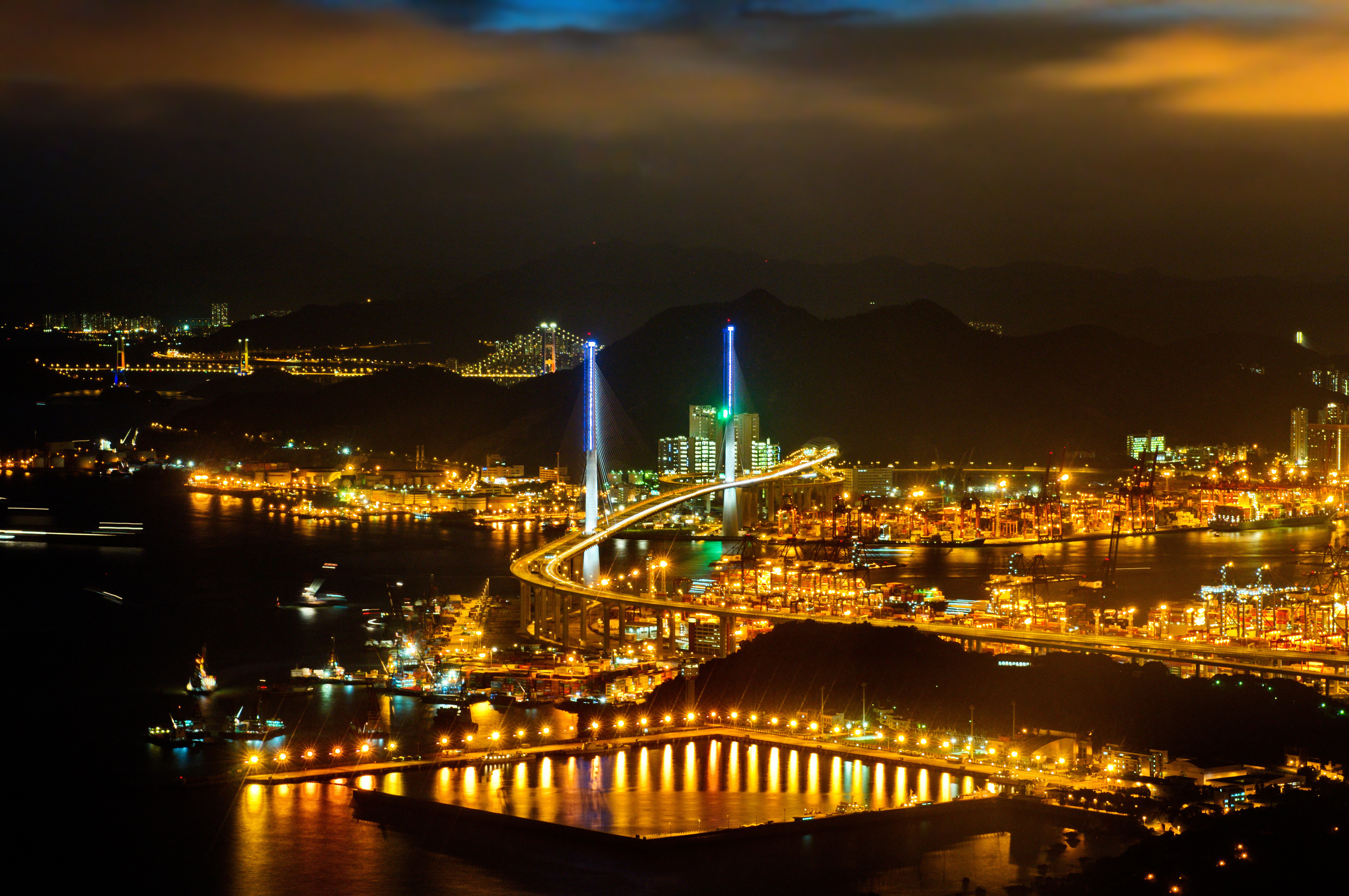
Kwai Tsing Container Terminals at night, crossed by Stonecutters Bridge

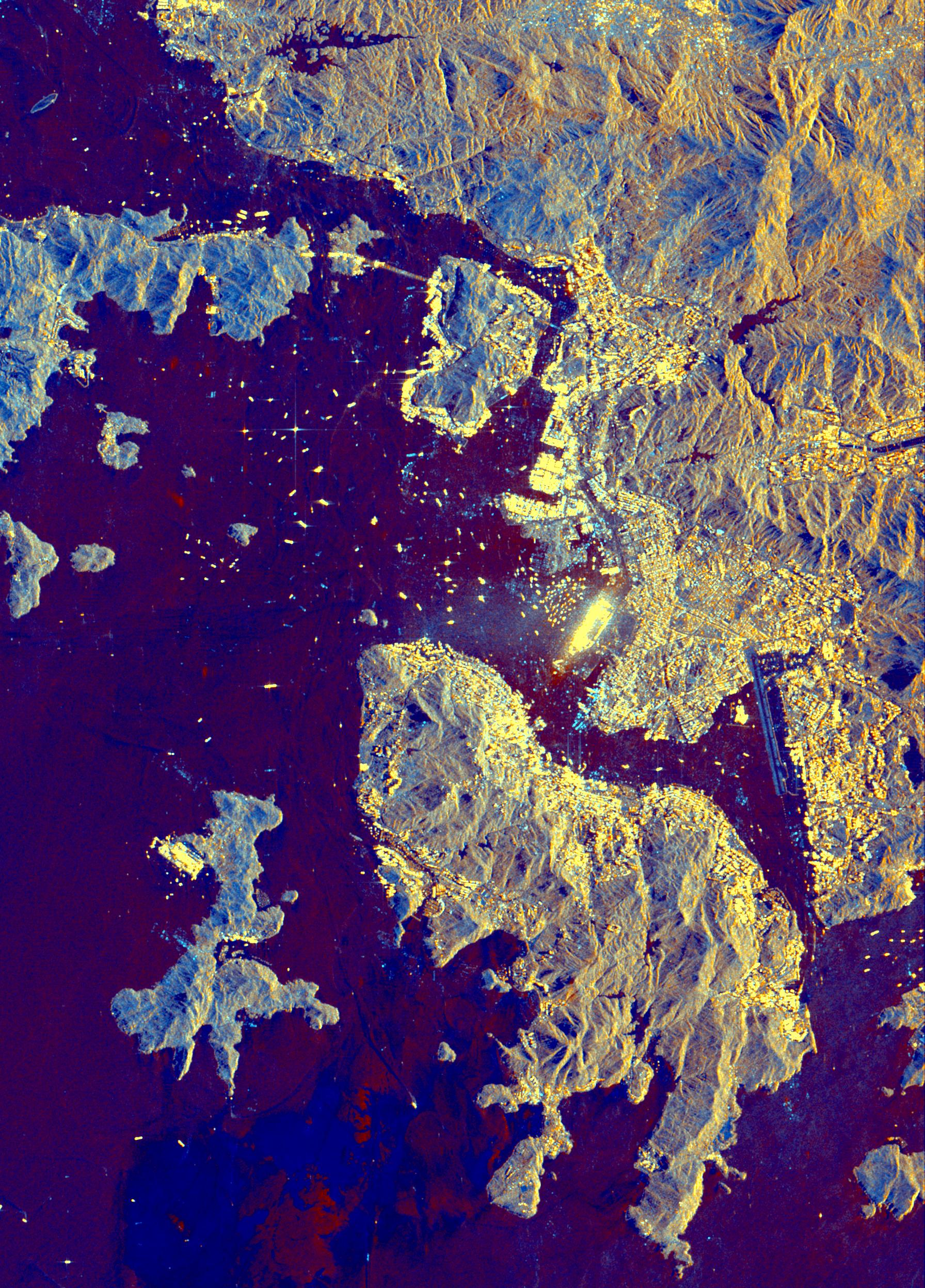
The waters of then-British Hong Kong as viewed from space in 1994

The Kwai Tsing Container Terminals (Kwai Chung Container Terminals until Container Terminal 9 was opened on Tsing Yi), located in the north-western part of the harbour, has nine container terminals with 24 berths of about 8,500 metres of frontage. It covers a total terminal area of about 2.7 km^{2} which includes container yards and container freight stations. The nine container terminals have a total handling capacity of over 18 million twenty-foot equivalent units (TEU).

These terminals are operated by five companies, namely:

- Modern Terminals Ltd. (MTL)
- Hongkong International Terminals Ltd. (HIT)
- COSCO Information & Technology (H.K.) Ltd. (COSCO)
- Dubai Port International Terminals Ltd. (DPI)
- Asia Container Terminals Ltd. (ACT)

The existing 9 terminals occupy 2.17 square kilometres of land, providing 18 berths and 6,592 metres deep water frontage. These terminals handle about 60% of total container traffic handled in Hong Kong.

In July, 2020, The Port of Hong Kong welcomed HMM Gdansk, the world's largest container vessel, on its maiden call to Hong Kong at Kwai Tsing Container Terminal 7.

Planning is underway for a potential Container Terminal 10 (CT10), with possible sites narrowed down to either southwest Tsing Yi or northwest Lantau, to the west of the airport.

Container terminals
Terminal	Operator	Depth (m)	Berths	Quay length (m)	Quay cranes	Area (m^{2})	Capacity (kTEUs)
Terminal 1 (CT1)	MTL	14	1		4		
Terminal 2 (CT2)	MTL	14	1		5		
Terminal 3 (CT3)	DPI	14	1	305	6	167,000	>1,200
Terminal 4 (CT4)	HIT	12.5	3		8		
Terminal 5 (CT5)	MTL	14	1		4		
Terminal 6 (CT6)	HIT	12.5–15.5	3		11		
Terminal 7 (CT7)	HIT	15.5	4		15		
Terminal 8 East (CT8E)	HIT/COSCO	15.5	2	640	9	300,000	1,800
Terminal 8 West (CT8W)	ACT	15.5	2	740	8	285,000	>2,000
Terminal 9 North (CT9N)	HIT	15.5	2	700	9	190,000	>2,600 (N&S)
Terminal 9 South (CT9S)	MTL	15.5	4	1,240	13	490,000	

==== River Trade Terminal at Tuen Mun ====
The River Trade Terminal at Tuen Mun involves the consolidation of containers, breakbulk, and bulk cargo shipped between the Hong Kong port and ports in the Pearl River Delta. The terminal is located near Pillar Point in Tuen Mun, New Territories, and is operated by River Trade Terminal Company Ltd. The 65-hectare terminal, completed in November 1999, has about 3,000 meters of quay, according to Hong Kong Port Development Council data.

=== Mid-stream ===
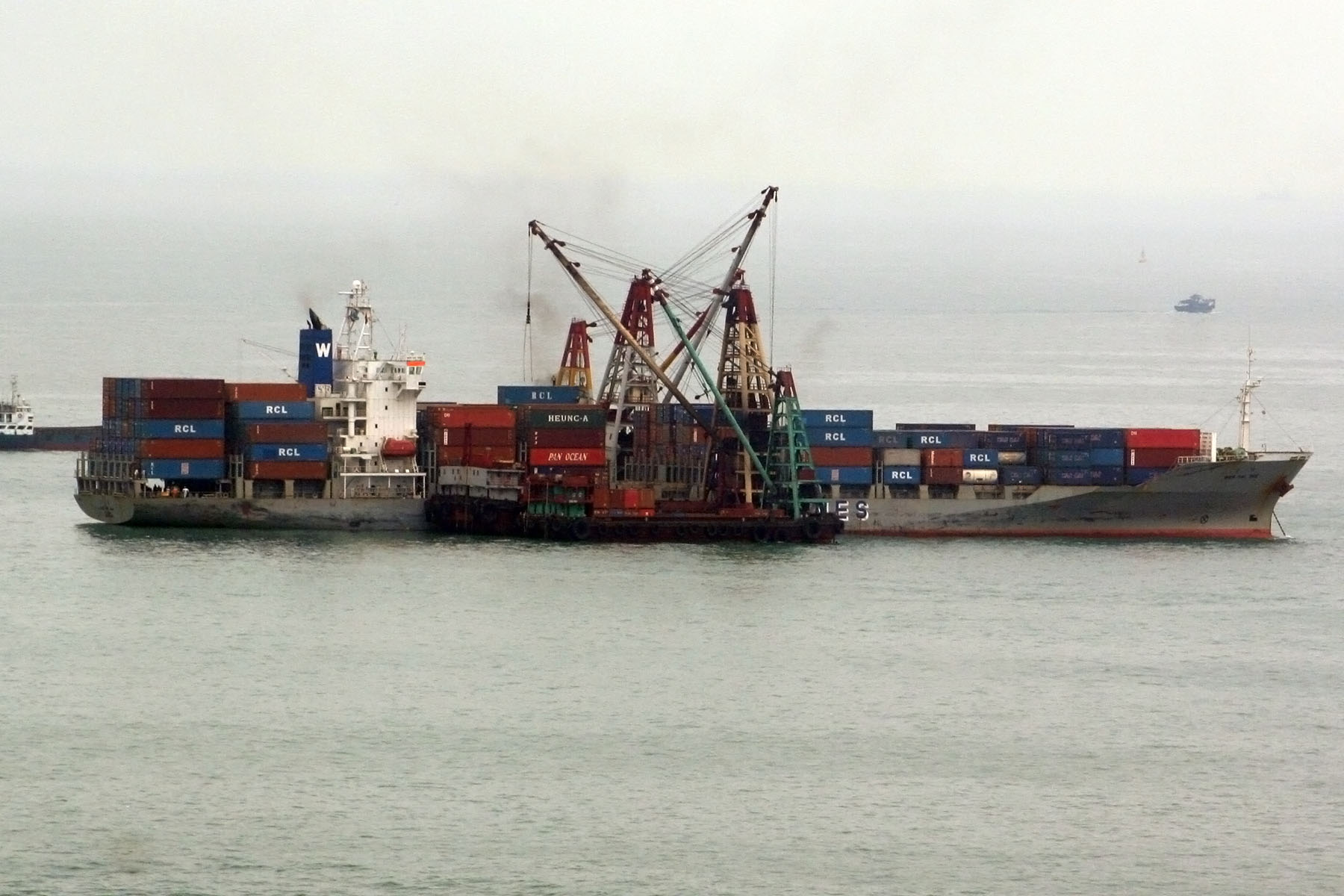
Mid-stream operations near Lamma Island

Mid-stream operation involves loading and unloading containers to and from ships while at sea, with barges or dumb steel lighters performing the transfer, and then distributing or landing the containers to piers nearby. Due to high handling fees at the container terminals, Hong Kong has become the only place in the world with at-sea loading and unloading operations.

Currently, there are 11 different yard sites solely for mid-stream operations, occupying a total land area of 27.5 hectares and waterfrontage of 3,197 metres.

== Ferry services ==
The Hong Kong–Macau Ferry Terminal between Central and Sheung Wan and the China Ferry Terminal in Tsim Sha Tsui provide centralised ferry services to Macau and 24 ports on mainland China. About 100 vessels, mostly high-speed passenger craft such as jetfoils, catamarans and hoverferries, operate from these terminals. In 2001, over 17 million passengers passed through the terminals, comprising approximately 11.2 million passenger trips to/from Macau and 6.5 million passenger trips to/from mainland ports.

== Government fleet ==
There are over 600 vessels of different types and sizes in the government fleet. About 152 vessels are major mechanised vessels serving under 16 government departments such as the Marine Police, Customs and Excise, and Fire Services. Some user departments operate and man their purpose-built vessels. The Marine Department itself controls about 100 vessels, including patrol launches, personnel carriers, pontoons, self-propelled barges and specialised vessels such as hydrographic survey launches and explosive carriers. These vessels provide support to the department's own port operations or serve other departments which do not have their own fleet. The Government Dockyard is responsible for the design, procurement and maintenance of all vessels owned by the Government. It occupies a site of 980,000 m^{2} on Stonecutters Island and has an 83,000 m^{2} protected water basin as an operational base for vessels operated by the Marine Department. The dockyard has a ship-lift system and three ship-hoists capable of drydocking vessels of up to 750 tonnes. An on-line computerised information system is employed to co-ordinate the maintenance activities and support services to maximise maintenance efficiency and vessel availability.

== Drydocks and slipways ==
The port has extensive facilities for repairing, maintaining, drydocking and slipping of all types of vessels. Two floating drydocks are located off the west coast of Tsing Yi Island and two northeast of Lantau Island. The largest is capable of docking vessels up to 150,000 tonnes deadweight (DWT). There is also a large number of smaller shipyards, which carry out repairs to vessels and build specialised craft, including sophisticated patrol craft and pleasure vessels for overseas markets.

== Port facilities and services ==
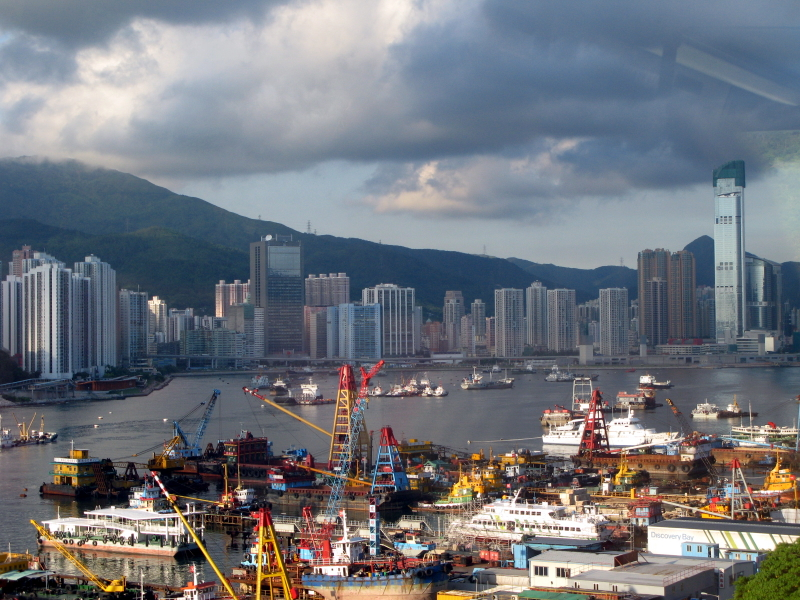
A Tsuen Wan port

=== Moorings and anchorages ===
The Marine Department operates and maintains 58 mooring buoys for seagoing vessels. Of these 31 are suitable for ships up to 183 metres in length and 27 for ships up to 137 metres. There are 44 special typhoon mooring buoys to which ships can remain secured during typhoons. This improves efficiency and reduces operational costs of vessels through elimination of unnecessary movements. In addition to the three Immigration and Quarantine Anchorages designated for visiting vessels to complete port formalities, there are eight dangerous goods and eight general-purpose anchorages providing temporary berthing spaces for vessels.

The areas and water depths of the anchorages are diversified to accommodate different sizes and draughts of ships calling at Hong Kong. There are over 460 modern marine aids to navigation throughout Hong Kong waters to guide mariners to and from their berths.

=== Navigation safety ===
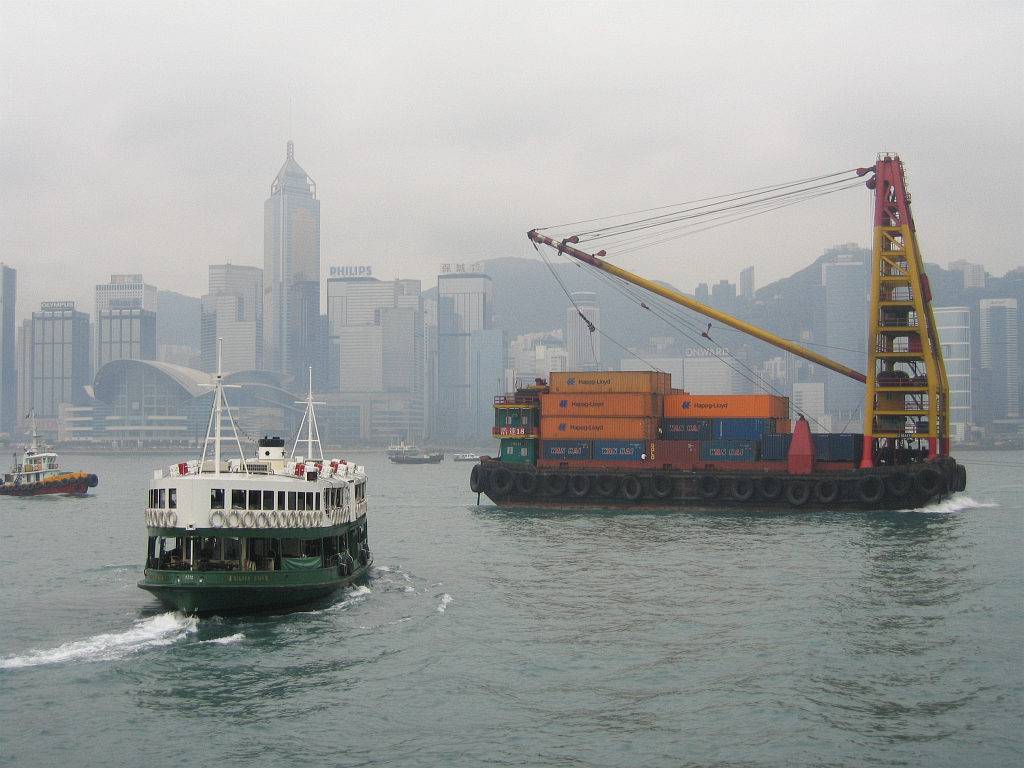
Cargo lighter passing the Star Ferry

All fairway buoys are lit and fitted with radar reflectors. Traffic Separation Schemes operate in the East Lamma Channel and Tathong Channel. The Marine Department's VHF radio network provides comprehensive marine communication coverage throughout the harbour and its approaches. The department has direct communication links with other maritime authorities and users worldwide. Locally, the department's Maritime Rescue Co-ordination Centre (MRCC) maintains direct contact with emergency response services, which include the Government Flying Service, Marine Police and Fire Services. MRCC provides 24-hour maritime distress alert monitoring and co-ordinates all maritime search and rescue operations within the Hong Kong search and rescue region in the South China Sea.

A comprehensive vessel traffic service is provided by the department's Vessel Traffic Centre (VTC), with radar surveillance and tracking capabilities as well as a fully integrated data handling sub-system, covers 95% of Hong Kong waters used by seagoing vessels and ferries. The VTC offers advice on the activities of other vessels and gives navigational information to mariners through a sectorised VHF network. This ensures the safety standard and traffic efficiency of the port. An upgraded vessel tracking system, which can track 4,000 moving vessels plus 1,000 stationary targets in real time, has been in operation since early 2002. It provides the latest technology such as AIS, ECDIS, CCTV, new VHF-direction finders and modern communications systems to further improve navigation safety and operation efficiency. Marine Department patrol launches maintain a watch on shipping, traffic separation schemes, fairways, navigational channels, typhoon shelter and cargo-working areas. They provide on-scene support to the VTC, and are in continuous radio contact with the VTC and local marine traffic control stations located at Ma Wan and Kwai Chung Container Port. The VTC is thus able to promptly initiate and co-ordinate actions required to facilitate safe navigation in the port.

The Hydrographic Office of the Marine Department surveys Hong Kong waters and produces nautical charts to facilitate safe navigation within the port. It functions with reference to the standards laid down by the International Hydrographic Organisation (IHO). Notices to Mariners are promulgated fortnightly to update bilingual nautical charts. A Differential Global Positioning System correction signal is broadcast continuously on 289 kHz to assist mariners using GPS navigation to position-fix their vessels more accurately. Tidal height predictions and real-time tidal information are provided on the department's website. Pilotage is compulsory for ships of 3,000 gross tons and above and gas carriers of any tonnage. Quarantine and immigration facilities are available on a 24-hour basis. Advance immigration clearance and radio pratique may be obtained by certain vessels on application.

=== Dangerous goods ===
Dangerous goods are moved in the waters of Hong Kong strictly in accordance with the International Maritime Dangerous Goods Code. Their movements must be recorded in the Marine Department's Dangerous Goods Information System. Firefighting vessels operated by the Fire Services Department are kept in a state of readiness at all times. The Marine Department's pollution control vessels are on 24-hour standby to deal with oil spills.

=== Other working facilities ===
To facilitate transfer of cargo between vessels and the shore, and cargo to and from Pearl River ports, the Marine Department provides and manages 7,756 metres of public cargo-working sea frontage in various parts of Hong Kong. Bulk handling facilities for coal and oil are provided at the power generating stations at Tap Shek Kok in Castle Peak and at Po Lo Tsui on Lamma Island.

== Hong Kong Shipping Register ==
Hong Kong is a major centre of ship ownership and management. Ships owned or managed in Hong Kong amount to 100 million gross tons. Hong Kong has been recognised by the international shipping sector as a first-rate ship registration centre, where registration of ships is entirely voluntary. At the end of 2001, 653 ships were registered in Hong Kong, with a total gross tonnage of 13.7 million tons – a 32 per cent growth over the previous year. The Hong Kong Shipping Register operates independently in its maritime policy and administration. The HKSAR Government issues related certificates under its own legislation in the name of 'Hong Kong, China'. As a quality shipping register, Hong Kong adopts all major international conventions promulgated by the International Maritime Organization (IMO). As an associate member of the IMO, the Government ensures that ships registered in Hong Kong are maintained to the highest international safety and marine environmental protection standards.

A Flag State Quality Control (FSQC) System was introduced in 1999 to monitor the performance of authorised classification societies and to maintain the quality of ships on the Hong Kong shipping register. Any Hong Kong-registered ship whose quality standard is found to be declining or which is detained by a port state for serious deficiencies will be subject to FSQC inspections by Marine Department surveyors. The department regulates the safety standards of all locally licensed vessels, currently numbering over 10,000. Marine Department surveyors also carry out surveys of new vessels being built abroad for licensing in Hong Kong. Examinations are held regularly for the issuance of both foreign-going and river-trade certificates of competency for masters, deck officers and engineers. In addition, local certificates of competency are issued to coxswains and engineers of locally licensed vessels, which operate within the waters of Hong Kong. An inspection and advice service is provided to promote safe working practices in ship-repairing, ship breaking, cargo-handling on ships and safety afloat.

== Seafarers ==
Hong Kong is a centre for employment of seafarers. 1,200 Hong Kong officers and ratings serve on board more than 420 seagoing ships of 12 different maritime nations. The mercantile marine office registers seafarers, regulates their employment on board ships of all flags and supervises the employment and discharge of seafarers on Hong Kong ships and foreign ships not represented in Hong Kong by a consulate office.

== See also ==
- Container transport
- Economy of Hong Kong
- List of East Asian ports
- List of harbours in Hong Kong
- Transportation in Hong Kong
