= List of international auto shipping companies =

This is a list of notable car carrier shipping companies.

Nationality	Company name	RORO	20 ft containers	40 ft containers
Australia	Seago International	Yes	Yes	Yes
Denmark	A. P. Moller-Maersk Group	No	Yes	Yes
Argentina	Delfino	No	Yes	Yes
France	Delmas	Yes	Yes	Yes
Taiwan	Evergreen Marine	No	Yes	Yes
Russia	Far East Shipping Company	Yes	Yes	Yes
China	Sinotrans	Yes	Yes	Yes
Philippines	2GO Group	Yes	Yes	Yes
Switzerland	Mediterranean Shipping Company	No	Yes	Yes
Taiwan	Yang Ming Marine Transport	No	Yes	Yes
Japan	Nippon Yusen Kaisha	Yes	Yes	Yes
