= Midstream (disambiguation) =

Midstream is a business category in the petroleum industry.

Midstream may also refer to:

- Midstream (album), a 1978 album by Debby Boone
- Midstream (film), a 1929 American film directed by James Flood
- Midstream (magazine), a Zionist magazine
- Mid-stream operation, the loading and unloading cargo containers at a container ship while at sea
