= China Changjiang National Shipping (Group) Corporation =

Chinese shipping company

CSC Group
- Type: State-owned enterprise
- Industry: Shipping and Logistics
- Headquarters: Wuhan, People's Republic of China
- Parent: China Merchants Group through Sinotrans&CSC Group

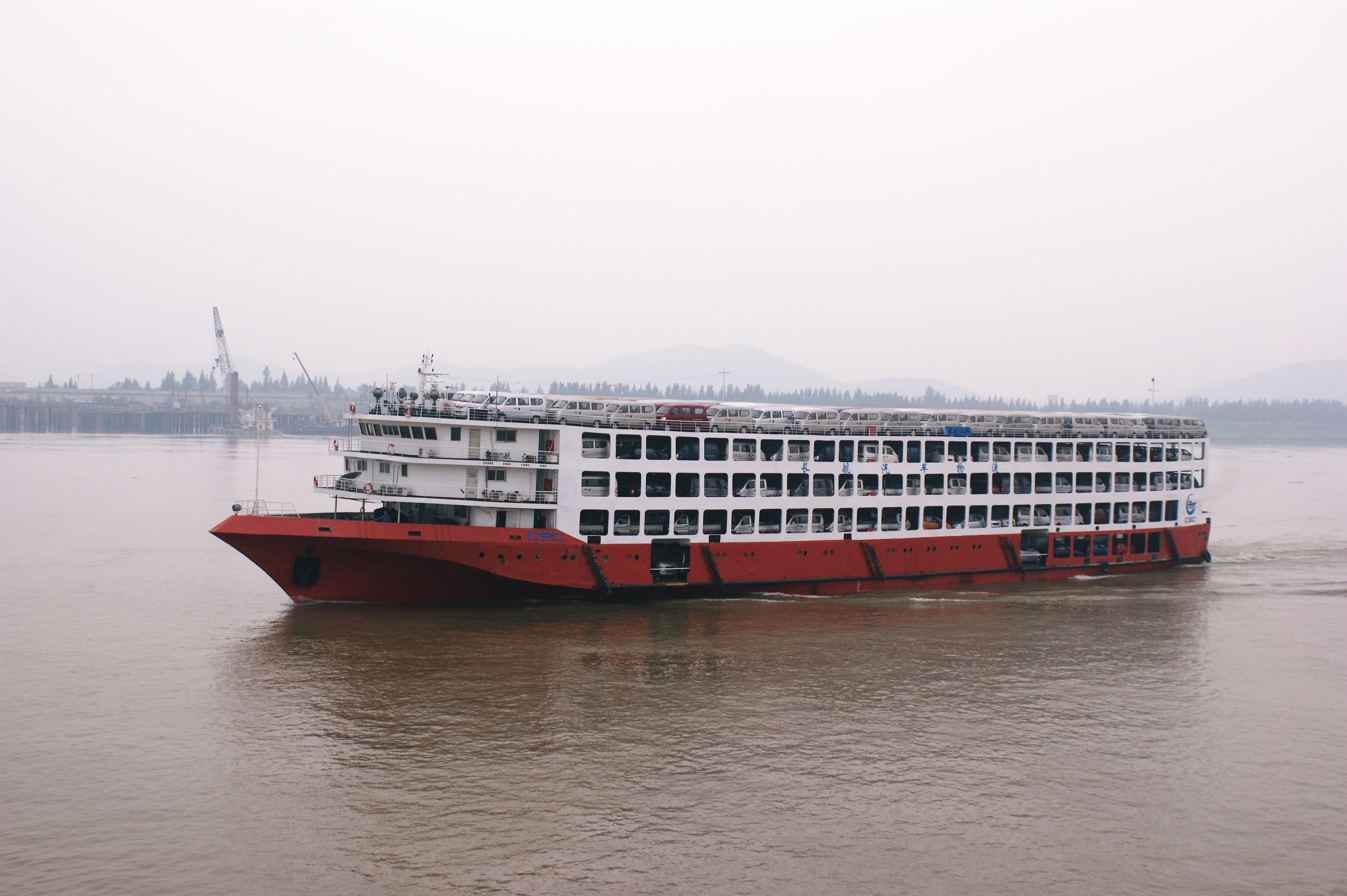

China Changjiang National Shipping (Group) Corporation (commonly referred to as CSC Group) is China's largest inland shipping company, with operations along the length of the Yangtze river. Its predecessors can be traced back to 1872, but the company in its present form dates back to 1950 when the Yangtze River Shipping Corporation was formed by the nationalisation of assets. This formed a core part of the China Yangtze River Shipping Group when created in 1992, ultimately gaining its present name in 1996.

In 2009 the company was reorganised together with the (also [state-owned]) China National Foreign Trade Transportation (Group) Corporation (Sinotrans) to form Sinotrans&CSC Holdings. A strategic merger of this new company together with China Merchants Group received approval from the State Council of the People's Republic of China in December 2015, and by April 2017 Sinotrans Limited (and its former subsidiary Sinotrans Shipping) had become direct subsidiaries of China Merchants Group.

As of 2014 the company and its subsidiaries operate four major shipyards:

- Jiangdong shipyard
- Jinling shipyard
- Qingshan shipyard, based in Wuhan, production of sub-50,000 ton ships
- Yichang shipyard, established in 1956, located in Yichang, production of sub-20,000 ton inland and coastal ships
