= Sinotrans Shipping =

Chinese shipping company

Sinotrans Shipping Ltd. 中外运航运有限公司
- Company type: State-owned enterprise
- Industry: Shipping and Logistics
- Founded: 2003
- Headquarters: Hong Kong, People's Republic of China
- Area served: People's Republic of China
- Key people: General Manager: Mr. Li Hua
- Number of employees: 653
- Parent: China Merchants Group (formerly Sinotrans&CSC Group)
- Website: Sinotrans Shipping Ltd.

Sinotrans Shipping Ltd. (Former stock code: SEHK: 368) is one of the largest shipping companies in China and a listed subsidiary of China Merchants Group headquartered in Hong Kong. It is engaged in vessel time and voyage chartering through its Dry Bulk Shipping and Container Shipping segments, alongside freight and container forwarding and container line services. The firm also provides shipping agency and fleet management services and ships liquefied natural gas, among other activities.

Sinotrans Shipping was established in 2003 as a subsidiary of Sinotrans Limited, and was listed on the Hong Kong Stock Exchange in 2007 with an IPO price of HK$8.28 per share. Sinotrans Limited subsequently merged in 2009 with CSC to form Sinotrans-CSC. A strategic merger of this new parent with China Merchants Group received approval from the State Council of the People's Republic of China in December 2015, and this resulted in the transfer (by April 2017) of Sinotrans Shipping to its current holding company.
