= Shanghai Maritime University =

Public university in Shanghai, China

Coordinates: 30.8731°N 121.902°E

- 上海海事大学
- Type: Public
- Established: 1909; 117 years ago
- President: Beiping Chu
- Students: 60,000 total
- Undergraduates: 7000
- Postgraduates: 2000
- Doctoral students: 1000
- Location: Pudong, Shanghai, China
- Campus: Urban and suburban
- Colors: Navy Blue
- Nickname: 上海海事/海运学院
- Website: www.shmtu.edu.cn

Shanghai Maritime University
- Simplified Chinese: 上海海事大学
- Traditional Chinese: 上海海事大學
Transcriptions
Standard Mandarin
- Hanyu Pinyin: Shànghǎi hǎishì dàxué

Shanghai Maritime University (SHMTU; Chinese: 上海海事大学) is a municipal public university in Shanghai, China. The university is affiliated with the Shanghai Municipal People's Government, and co-sponsored by the municipal government and the Ministry of Transportation of China.

Shanghai Maritime University is multidisciplinary with six fields of study: Engineering, Management, Economics, Literature, Science and Law. It is one of the best Chinese universities for specialization in maritime, shipping and transport education.

== History ==
- 1909: Shanghai Industrial College, with the Shipping Section
- 1911: The Merchant Marine College under the Ministry of Post and Transport, with the Navigation Section
- 1912: Wusong (Woosung) Merchant Marine School, with the Navigation Section
- 1929: Wusong Merchant Marine College under the Ministry of Transport, with the Navigation Section
- 1930: Wusong Merchant Marine College, with the Marine Engineering Section added.
- 1939: Chongqing National Merchant Marine College, with the Ship Building Section added to the previous two.
- 1943: The above college was incorporated into Chongqing National University of Transport, keeping the Sections of Navigation and Marine Engineering, and changing the Ship Building Section to the Ship-Building Engineering Department.
- 1946: Wusong National Merchant Marine College, with the Sections of Navigation and Marine Engineering
- 1948: Added to that college was the Telecommunications Section, offering short-term advanced training.
- 1950: With the merging of the above college and the Shipping Management Department of Jiaotong University, the Shanghai Nautical College emerged, offering the marine navigation speciality in the Navigation Department, the marine engineering specialty in the Marine Engineering Department, and the radio communication specialty at the associate-baccalaureate level.
- 1951: Added to the Shanghai Nautical College was the Harbor Engineering Department, offering the specialties of waterway transportation and port management.
- 1953: The merging of the Shanghai Nautical College and the Northeast Navigation College.
- 1958: The decision of the Ministry of Communications to restore maritime education in Shanghai and establish Shanghai Maritime University.
- 1959: The founding of Shanghai Maritime Institute by the Ministry of Communications.
- 2004: The Institute officially changed its name to Shanghai Maritime University.

== Present ==
Since 2000, SMU has been mainly administered by Shanghai Municipality and has been co-constructed by Shanghai Municipality and the Ministry of Communications. (SMU was established by the Ministry of Communications in 1959.)

SMU provides 35 programs leading to a Bachelor's degree and 12 programs leading to an associate degree. SMU has been authorized by the state to offer 30 programs leading to a master's degree and seven programs leading to a doctorate. The courses of Communications and Transport Planning and Management, Industrial Economics, Power Electronics and Electrical Drive, International Law, Mechanical Design and Theory, Logistics Management and Engineering, Delivery Means Utilization Engineering and Port Machinery Electronics Engineering have been designated as key specialties by the Ministry of Communications and Shanghai Municipality. The specialties of Customs Logistics, International Trade and Economics and Maritime Law are classified as Shanghai's key bachelor's degree disciplines for further development. In 2004, SMU got an "A" in the Undergraduate Teaching Evaluation by the Ministry of Education.

SMU has a full-time student population of near 15,000, of whom over 10,000 are studying for a bachelor's degree and over 2000 for a master's degree. for decades, SMU has been devoted to fostering qualified talents for shipping industry. SMU has provided the shipping enterprises, public institutions and government departments with over 40,000 graduates.

=== Shanghai government scholarships ===
Shanghai government offers some scholarships for international students at the university. Most of them are at graduate levels. Some of them are:

- Class A full scholarship
- Class B semi-scholarship
- Class C limited scholarship

The school offers a MSc degree in International Transport and Logistics as a branch of the World Maritime University.

== See also ==
- Chinese shipping
- Dalian Maritime University
