= Parakou Shipping =

Hong Kong shipping firm

Parakou Shipping Group
- Company type: Shipping
- Industry: Shipping management, chartering, owning, supply, storage, building.
- Founded: 1985
- Headquarters: 1510-1512A, West Tower, Shun Tak Centre, 168-200 Connaught Road Central Hong Kong
- Website: www.parakougroup.com

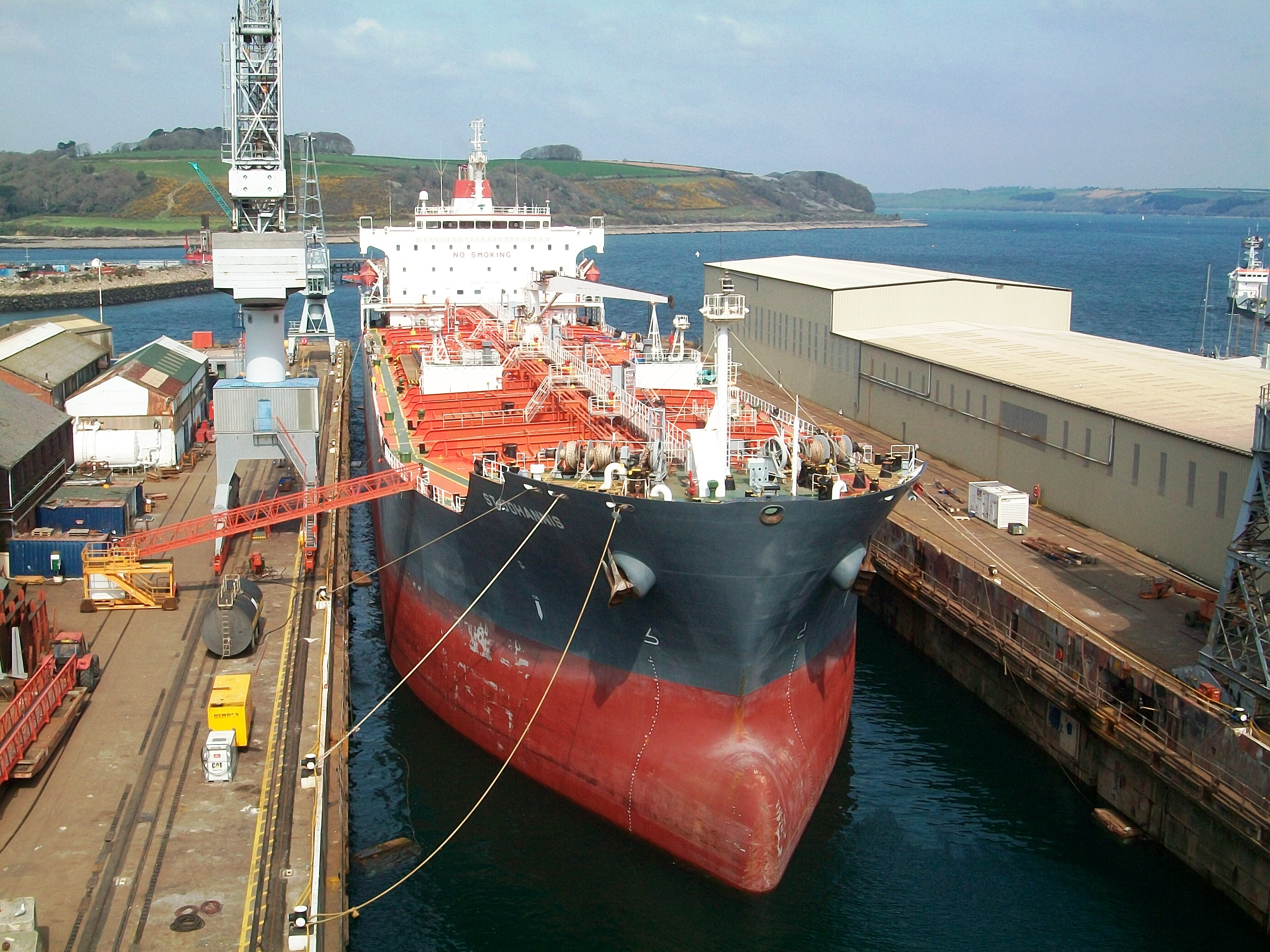
One of Parakou's Oil/Chemical Tankers, St. Johannis in the dock at Falmouth in 2012

Parakou Shipping or Parakou Group is a Hong Kong shipping firm founded in 1985. Its headquarters are located at 1510-1512A, West Tower, Shun Tak Centre, 168-200 Connaught Road Central, Hong Kong.

It began as a shipping management and chartering firm but has since branched out into ship owning, supplies and port services, storage, crew management and new building services. Parakou Shipping has Estimated Turnover is $3.25M. In the early 1990s, Parakou Shipping began to rationalize its fleet by replacing old ships with new ships, resulting in about 100 ships being made in shipyards in Japan, Korea and China. The group has offices in Beijing, Shanghai, Manila and in particular Singapore.
