= Hong Kong Maritime Rescue Co-ordination Centre =

- 香港海事救援協調中心

Co-ordinating body overview
- Formed: 1989
- Jurisdiction: Hong Kong Maritime Search and Rescue Region
- Headquarters: Marine Department, Harbour Building, 38 Pier Road, Central, Hong Kong
- Motto: We are One in Promoting Excellence in Marine Services
- Minister responsible: Maisie Cheng, Director of Marine
- Parent department: Hong Kong Marine Department
- Website: Official website

Hong Kong Maritime Rescue Co-ordination Centre
- Traditional Chinese: 香港海事救援協調中心
- Simplified Chinese: 香港海事救援协调中心
Transcriptions
Standard Mandarin
- Hanyu Pinyin: Xiāng gǎng hǎi shì jiù yuán xié diào zhōng xīn
Yue: Cantonese
- Yale Romanization: Hēung góng hói sih gau wùhn hip tìuh jūng sām
- Jyutping: Heong^{1} gong^{2} hoi^{2} si^{6} gau^{3} wun^{4} hip^{3} tiu^{4} zung^{1} sam^{1}

The Hong Kong Maritime Rescue Co-ordination Centre (HKMRCC) is responsible for coordinating air-sea rescue in Hong Kong and an extensive area of the South China Sea. Besides the territorial waters of Hong Kong, the area includes international waters lying to the north of latitude 10° north, to the west of longitude 120° east, and bounded by mainland China, Vietnam, the Philippines and Taiwan. The area covered is known as the Hong Kong Maritime Search and Rescue Region.

The MRCC is a co-ordination centre and neither possesses nor has direct command over search and rescue (SAR) resources. Its role is to co-ordinate all available SAR resources to perform a maritime search and rescue mission. In doing this it may call on the resources of:

- the Hong Kong Police Force Marine Region
- the Hong Kong Marine Department
- the Hong Kong Government Flying Service
- the Hong Kong Fire Services Department
- equivalent resources of other governments in the region
- naval forces in the region
- merchant shipping and fishing vessels in the vicinity of the incident

For administrative purposes, the MRCC forms part of the Hong Kong Marine Department.
