= Sinotrans Changhang Group =

Chinese logistics company

Sinotrans&CSC Group
- Company type: State-owned enterprise
- Industry: Shipping and Logistics
- Founded: 2008
- Headquarters: Beijing, People's Republic of China
- Area served: World
- Key people: Executive Director and President: Song Dexing
- Revenue: 89.044 billion renminbi (2015)
- Number of employees: 51,511 (2015)
- Website: www.sinotrans-csc.com

Sinotrans Changhang, or Sinotrans&CSC Holdings, is the largest logistics company of the People's Republic of China, with further interests in shipping and shipbuilding. The group is state-owned and was formed in March 2009 by the reorganisation of two other state-owned enterprises, the China National Foreign Trade Transportation (Group) Corporation (Sinotrans) and the China Changjiang National Shipping (Group) Corporation (CSC).

In December 2015 the State Council gave its approval for a further strategic reorganisation as part of a wider drive to improve the vitality and competitiveness of state-owned corporations. This entailed the integration of Sinotrans Changhang into the China Merchants Group, a process which was completed by April 2017.

In January 2025, the company was added to a United States Department of Defense list of companies that allegedly work with the People's Liberation Army.
