= Marine Department (Hong Kong) =

Government agency of Hong Kong

- 海事處

Agency overview
- Headquarters: Harbour Building, 38 Pier Road, Central, Hong Kong
- Employees: 1,484
- Annual budget: HK$1623.3m (2019–20)
- Agency executive: Carol Yuen (袁小惠), Director of Marine
- Website: www.mardep.gov.hk

Marine Department
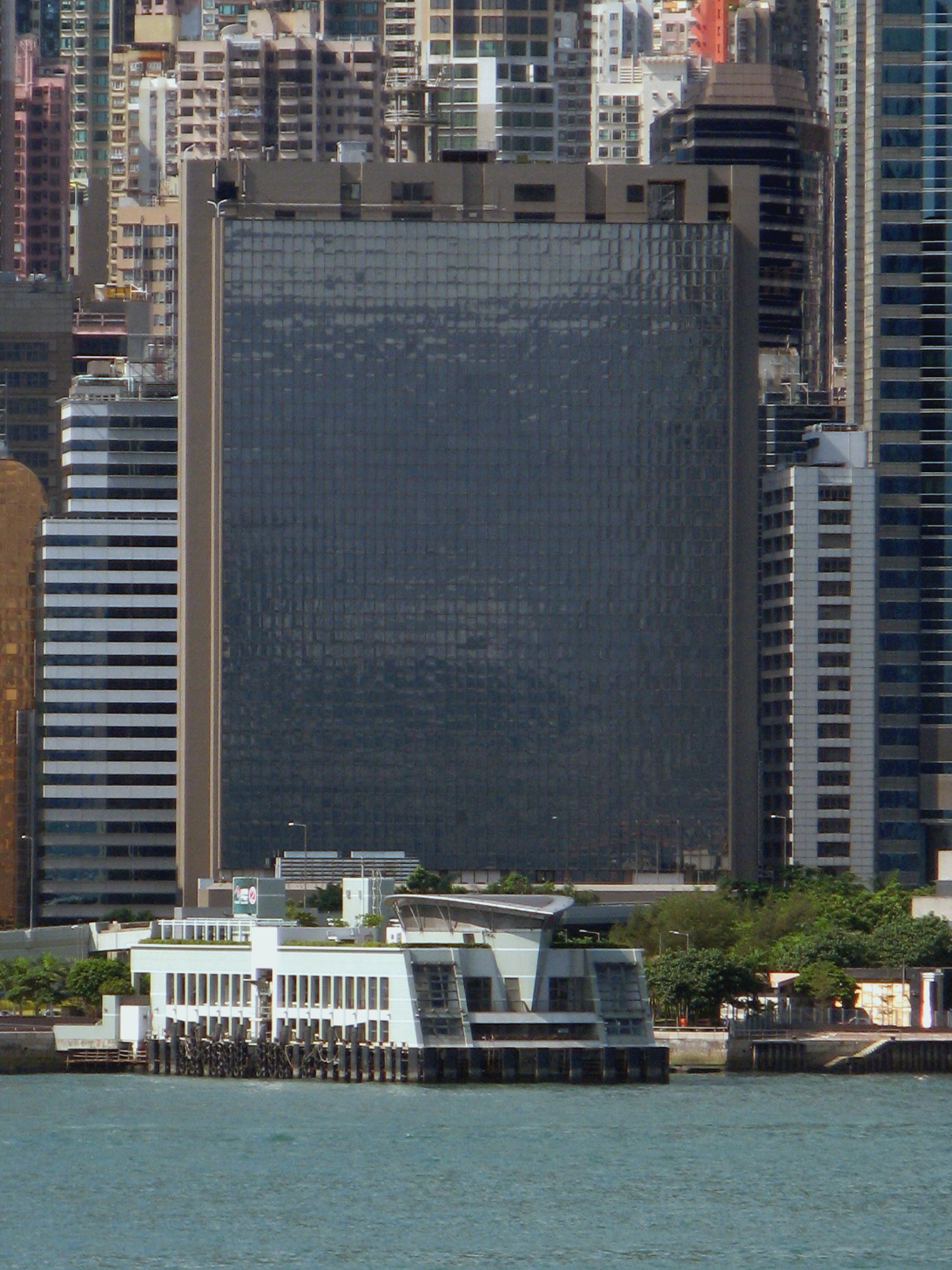
- Harbour Building, which has the agency's head office
- Traditional Chinese: 海事處
- Simplified Chinese: 海事处
- Jyutping: Hoi2 si6 cyu3
- Cantonese Yale: Hói sih chyu
Transcriptions
Standard Mandarin
- Hanyu Pinyin: Hǎishìchù
Yue: Cantonese
- Yale Romanization: Hói sih chyu
- Jyutping: Hoi2 si6 cyu3

The Marine Department of the Hong Kong Special Administrative Region (MarDep) is an agency of the government of Hong Kong. It is responsible for maintaining the safety and environmental protection of the Port of Hong Kong, tracking registered foreign ships, monitoring shipping traffic in Hong Kong waters, and launching search and rescue operations in the South China Sea.

The department's head office is in the Harbour Building in Central, Hong Kong. The department also conducts investigations of marine accidents.

The department is led by the Director of Marine, Carol Yuen (袁小惠), who reports to the Secretary for Transport and Housing.

The Marine Department is also responsible for coordinating the following operations in the waters around Hong Kong:

- Hong Kong Maritime Rescue Co-ordination Centre – search and rescue
- administering ship registration in Hong Kong
- ensuring compliance with international and marine laws
- ensuring compliance with environmental protection standards and combating pollution (oil spills)
- providing and maintaining government vessels (Government Dockyard)
- facilitating the safe and expeditious movement of ships

Hong Kong is a major cargo port—in 2000, it processed 175 million tonnes of cargo and 18.1 million TEU. The Marine Department is also the port authority of the territory.

== Facilities ==
- 6,000 metres (6,600 yd) of quays – Kwai Chung and Stonecutters Container Terminals
- 7,750 metres (8,480 yd) of quays at public cargo working areas
- 58 mooring buoys for ocean-going vessels
- 2 ferry terminals
- Marine Department port facility – former Royal Navy base – HMS Tamar on Stonecutters Island (500 operational vessels)
- All lighthouses in the territory — List of lighthouses in Hong Kong

== History ==
Hong Kong Marine Department vessel

The Marine Department, called the Harbour Department in the early days, oversees harbour affairs and manages various aviation activities. The Marine Department was under the Economic Service Branch before 1997, and the Economic Development and Labour Bureau before 2007. The Marine Department has been part of the Transport and Housing Bureau since 1 July, 2007.

== Reform ==
On 19 April, 2013, the Lamma Island Accident Investigation Board submitted a 238-page report about the 2012 Lamma Island ferry collision to the Hong Kong Government. On 30 April, 2013, the chief executive, Leung Chun Ying, announced the report of the Lamma Island accident and noted that the report analyzed the causes of the collision, the vessel's quick submersion, and serious injuries. He also admitted that the department was not monitoring vessels efficiently, and that year, improving that system would be a priority. He said that he has instructed the Transport and Housing Bureau and the Marine Department to adopt the contents of the report in order to improve maritime safety in Hong Kong. In addition, if officials involved were found culpable for human error and misconduct, the Hong Kong government would strictly deal with the problem, including disciplinary hearings.

On the same day, the Secretary for Transport and Housing Authority announced the establishment of the Marine Department Reform Steering Committee, chaired by him. Later, he announced two appointees, former Ombudsman Alice Tai and Arts Development Advisory Commissioner Koo, who would both term two years. He said the Hong Kong government will learn its lesson, and the committee will conduct a comprehensive review of the system of the Marine Department, including management, licensing regulatory, enforcement and inspections, and other matters, and launch a reform program timetable. In addition, he said that the Steering Committee has obtained the consent of CSB to send a Grade B officer to become the deputy director of Marine, a personal assistant, and two additional assistant directors. The Marine Department would invite international experts to advise on their next steps. Director of Marine Liaohan Bo said the Marine Department would cooperate with reforms, including the establishment of the Executive Team to coordinate inspection affairs.

On 21 May, 2013, the Steering Committee held its first meeting about the Marine Department, focusing on three points: reviewing the regulation of passenger safety and inspections of Hong Kong vessels, reforming those plans and monitoring them; reorganizing the operations management processes, operating procedures and oversight structure, in order to strengthen internal control; and solving personnel shortages in the department, developing new training programs. The commission agreed to hold a meeting every two weeks. Reform would be divided into two phases; the first phase involved inspecting then-current processes and procedures in the hope that within 4-6 months upgraded plans could be devised and implemented, followed by a deep reform of the Marine Department with a comprehensive review.

== See also ==
- Hong Kong Police Force
- Marine Region of the Hong Kong Police Force
