= Ship registration in Hong Kong =

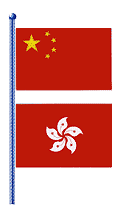
Colours of a Hong Kong Registered Ship

The Hong Kong Shipping Register was set up in 1990 under the Hong Kong Merchant Shipping (Registration) Ordinance, administered by the Marine Department (Hong Kong). Since the transfer of sovereignty by the United Kingdom in 1997, Hong Kong is authorised under the Basic Law by the Government of the People's Republic of China, using the name "Hong Kong, China" to maintain a separate ship registration system.

In April 1999, the Hong Kong Government launched some new measures to improve the ship registration system in Hong Kong. By cooperation of government and shipping industry, the total tonnage of ship registry in Hong Kong has reached over 129 million gross tons with over 2,400 vessels registered in May 2020.

As of 2020 the Hong Kong Ship Register is the world's fourth largest ship register.

== Ship registry fee ==
The first time registration fee for a ship is determined according to its Gross Tonnage (GT).

First registration fee (based on GT)
Gross tonnage of ships	Registration fee (HK$)
500GT or below	3,500
over 500GT	15,000

The annual tonnage charge for a ship is determined referring to its Net Tonnage (NT).

The minimum annual tonnage charge is HK$1,500 with every tonne above 1000 NT costing an extra HK$3.5 until 15,000 NT, whereby the rate lowers to HK$3 per tonne thereafter. The charge would not exceed HK$77,500.

Annual tonnage fee (example)
Net tonnage of ships	Fee (HK$)
1,000 or below	1,500
5,000	15,500
10,000	33,000
15,000	50,500
20,000	65,500
24,000 or upwards	77,500

Annual Tonnage Charge (ATC) Reduction Scheme

Since February 2006, the Annual Tonnage Charge (ATC) Reduction Scheme has been enacted to reduce the long term cost for ship owners, whereby, for every two years of the qualifying period, satisfying:

1. given the ship is continuously registered with the Hong Kong Shipping Register;
2. given the ship has no detention record under any Port State Control during said period,

-the registered ship owner would have the right to enjoy a six months ATC reduction for the following year in general.

== Preferential port dues ==
Hong Kong registered ships can enjoy about 30% preferential port dues in mainland China ports since January 2000. In order to reduce port and light dues for Hong Kong registered ships, HKSAR expects to sign up agreements with other countries which have a two-tier charging system.

== Block registration incentive scheme ==
The Marine Department announced on February 14, 2025 a refund scheme of the ship registration fee and the first-year annual tonnage charge called the Block Registration Incentive Scheme.

If more than one eligible ship is registered with the Hong Kong Shipping Registry (HKSR) within 24 months, the owners of the ships concerned are eligible for a refund, with the view to attracting more shipowners to register their ships in Hong Kong.

== Shipping profit taxation ==
Income derived from the international trade of Hong Kong registered ships is exempted from profits tax. HKSAR has also entered into bilateral double taxation relief agreements with 40 countries which include:

Agreement for the avoidance of double taxation (DTA):
Denmark, Germany, Netherlands, Norway, Singapore, Sri Lanka, United Kingdom, United States;

Reciprocal tax exemption (RTE):
Chile, Korea, New Zealand;

Comprehensive DTA (CDTA):
Austria, Belgium, Brunei, Canada, Czech, France, Guernsey, Hungary, Indonesia, Ireland, Italy, Japan, Jersey, Korea, Kuwait, Liechtenstein, Luxembourg, Mainland China, Malaysia, Malta, Mexico, Netherlands, New Zealand, Portugal, Qatar, Romania, South Africa, Spain, Switzerland, Thailand, United Arab Emirates, United Kingdom, Vietnam

== Quality assurance system ==
The Flag State Quality Control (FSQC) System is based on an information system to monitor the quality of Hong Kong registered ships. By analyzing and collecting the information, unqualified conditions of a ship will be identified for Flag State inspection.

The Pre-registration Quality Control (PRQC) System involves the Marine Department which will inspect a ship's condition before it is registered in Hong Kong. The ship should meet all safety and pollution prevention standards announced by International Maritime Organization.

== See also ==
- Hong Kong shipping register
