= Sinotrans Limited =

Logistic company in China

Sinotrans 中国外运股份有限公司
- Company type: State-owned enterprise
- Traded as: SEHK: 598
- Industry: Shipping and Logistics
- Founded: 2002
- Headquarters: Beijing, People's Republic of China
- Area served: People's Republic of China
- Key people: Chairman: Mr. Wang Hong
- Revenue: 72.567 billion renminbi (2015)
- Number of employees: 23,971
- Parent: China Merchants Group through Sinotrans&CSC Group
- Website: www.sinotrans.com

Sinotrans Limited (commonly referred to as Sinotrans) is one of the largest logistics companies in China. The business areas of the company include storage and terminal services and trucking and marine transportation.

== Operations ==
Sinotrans operates railway freight connections from four centers in China. The operation centers are in Guangzhou, Shenzhen and Dongguan in Guangdong, and in Changsha, Hunan. The international railway freight network is an implementation of the Belt and Road Initiative. Among the China-Europe express freight train routes is a link between Shenzhen and Duisburg, which travels through Kazakhstan, Russia, Belarus, and Poland. In Southeast Asia, Sinotrans established a service between Shenzhen and Vientiane in December 2021 after the opening of the Boten–Vientiane railway with the newly opened segment also forming a continuous railway route between Singapore and Portugal.

== History ==
The company was incorporated in 2002 and listed on the Hong Kong Stock Exchange in 2003 as a vehicle for the core business, assets and staff of the state-owned China National Foreign Trade Transportation (Group) Corporation. In 2009, the company was reorganised together with the China Changjiang National Shipping (Group) Corporation (CSC) to form Sinotrans&CSC Holdings.

A strategic merger of this new company together with China Merchants Group received approval from the State Council of the People's Republic of China in December 2015, and by April 2017 Sinotrans Limited (and its former subsidiary Sinotrans Shipping) had become direct subsidiaries of China Merchants Group.

== See also ==
- List of largest container shipping companies
