= Mid-stream operation =

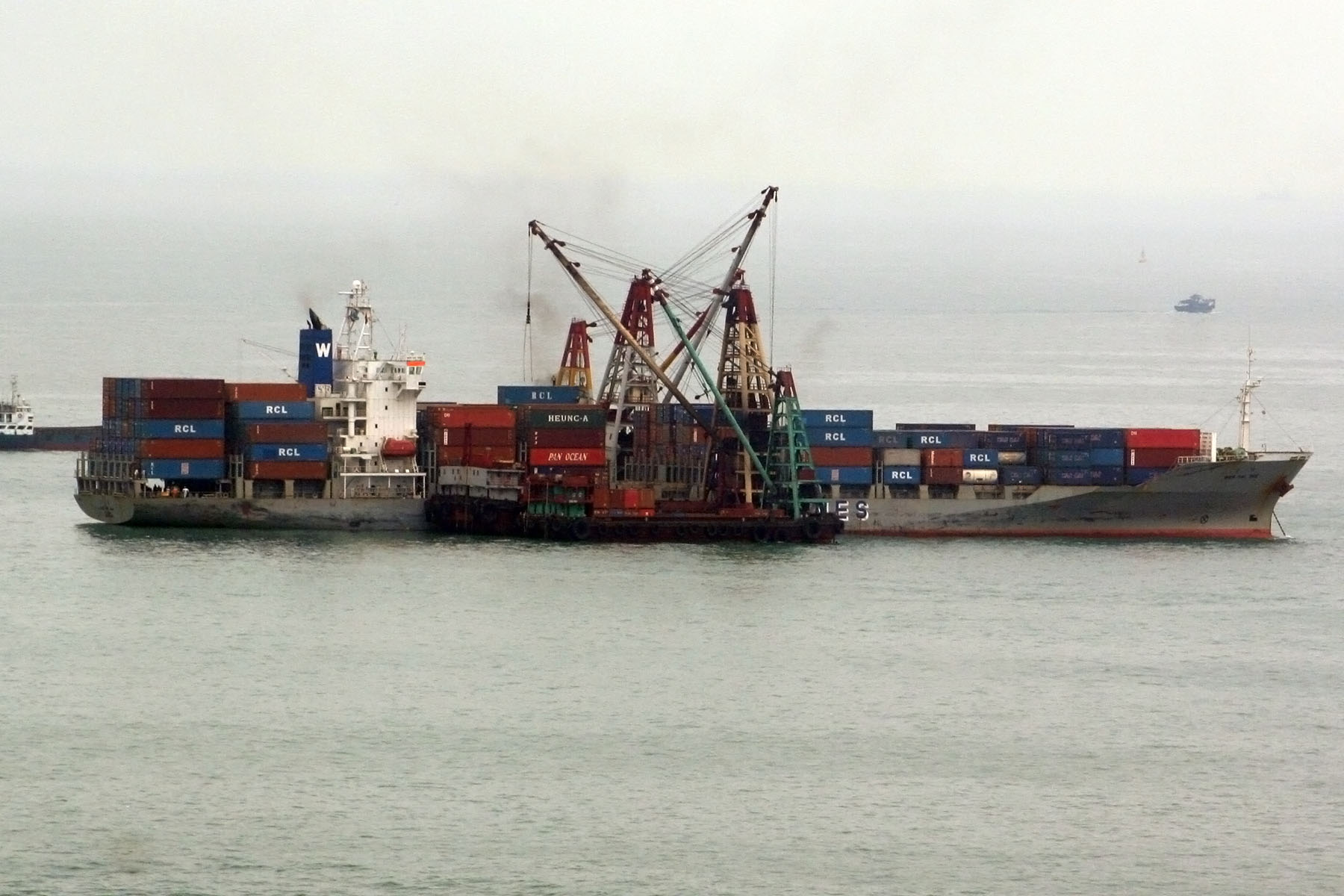
Mid-stream operations in Hong Kong, at the North Lamma Anchorage, near Lamma Island. Small barges with cranes offload containers.

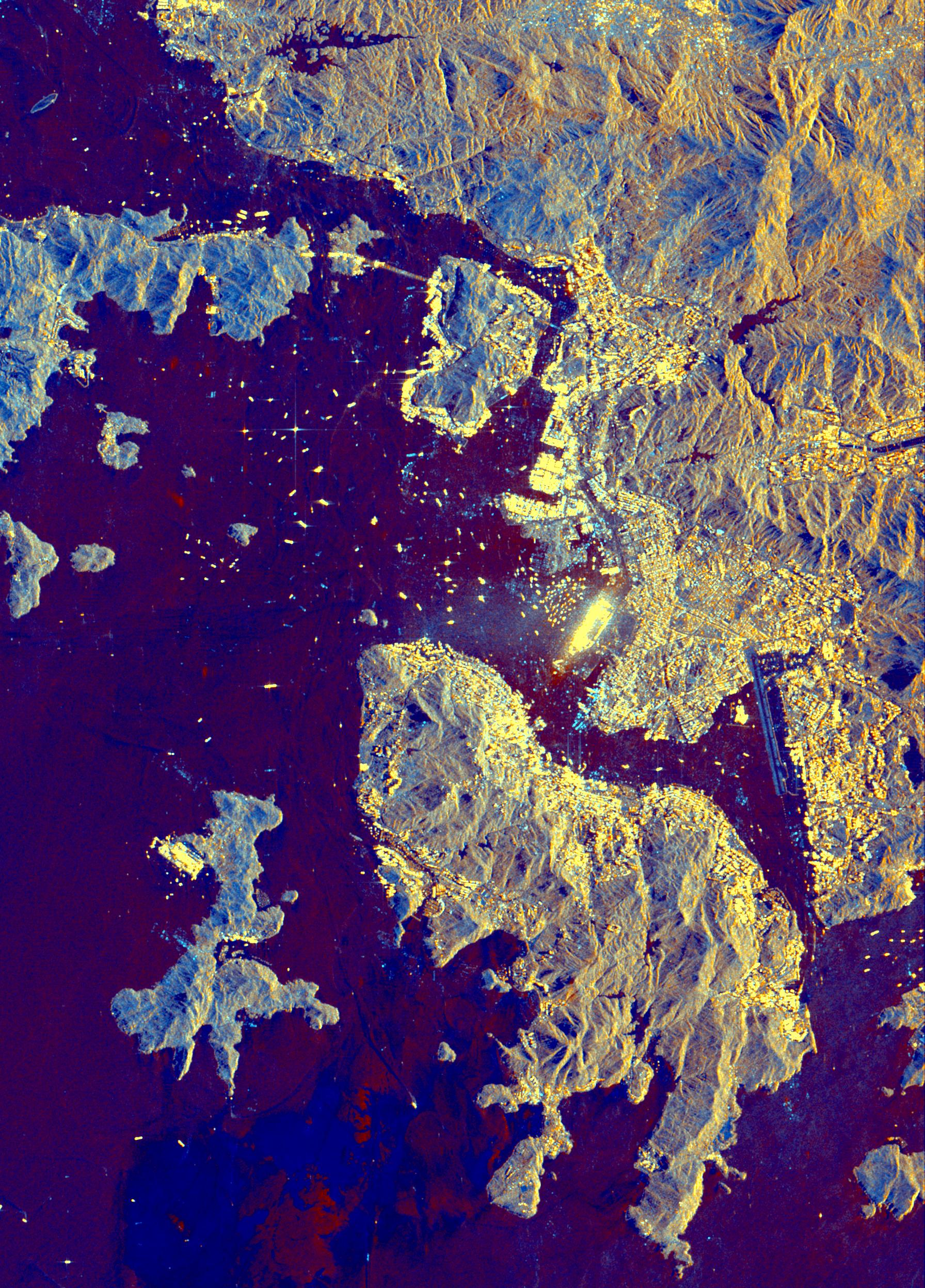
The waters of Hong Kong viewed from space

Mid-stream operation (MSO) is the loading and unloading cargo from a ship while at sea with barges or dumb steel lighters, distributing or landing containers to piers nearby.

It has the significant advantage of lower cost and the ability to load or unload from both sides of the cargo ship, but has been criticized for the danger and difficulty of transferring cargoes between two vessels at sea. MSO has been abandoned almost everywhere except Hong Kong, where the cost difference is significant, but the practice is declining even there.

== History ==
MSO has played a major role in Hong Kong since the 1960s. In the 1970s, this included cargo containers, peaking in the early 1990s. Barges, each equipped with a single derrick—unique to Hong Kong—were developed capable of carrying 48 to around 50 twenty-foot equivalent unit (TEU) containers and handling a vessel with 3500 TEUs in a day. The barges are generally not self-propelled and require tugboats to move them. As of 2019, there were about 250 such barges working in Hong Kong.

The percentage of cargo containers handled by MSO has dropped from over 30% in the early 1990s to around 10% or slightly over 5% around 2019, despite peaking in 2004 with a record 4.2 million TEUs. As of 2019, there were 11 sites exclusively dedicated to MSO, occupying an area of 27.5 hectares (68 acres) and water frontage of 3,194 metres (10,479 ft), and three operators working regularly: Fat Kee Stevedores Ltd., Tai Wah Sea/Land Heavy Transportation Ltd. and Transward Ltd.

== See also ==
- Ship-to-ship cargo transfer
- Underway replenishment
- Port of Hong Kong
