= MSC Cordoba =

History
- Name: MSC Cordoba
- Owner: Mediterranean Shipping Company S.A.
- Operator: Mediterranean Shipping Company S.A.
- Port of registry: Monrovia, Liberia
- Ordered: 2005
- Builder: Daewoo Mangalia Heavy Industries, Mangalia, Romania
- Yard number: 4,063
- Launched: 22 July 2007
- Christened: 2008
- Completed: 2008
- Identification: IMO number: 9349801; MMSI number: 636091473; Callsign: A8OF8
- Status: in service

General characteristics
- Tonnage: 54,549 DWT
- Length: 275 m (902 ft)
- Beam: 32 m (105 ft)
- Depth: 21.5 m (71 ft)
- Decks: 8
- Propulsion: 4 × B&W 7K98MCC diesels; combined 39,352 kW (52,772 hp)
- Speed: 24 knots (44 km/h)

MSC Cordoba is a container ship built in 2008 by the Daewoo Mangalia Heavy Industries in Mangalia, Romania and currently operated by Mediterranean Shipping Company S.A. She is the sixth ship delivered to the Swiss company in a series of 12 ordered. The 54,549 DWT ship has a container capacity of 4,860 TEUs.
