= MSC Carouge =

History
- Name: MSC Carouge
- Owner: Mediterranean Shipping Company S.A.
- Operator: Mediterranean Shipping Company S.A.
- Port of registry: Madeira, Portugal
- Ordered: 2005
- Builder: Daewoo Mangalia Heavy Industries, Mangalia, Romania
- Yard number: 4,055
- Launched: 28 December 2006
- Christened: 2007
- Completed: 2007
- Identification: IMO number: 9320441; MMSI number: 255805617; Callsign: CQFP
- Status: in service

General characteristics
- Tonnage: 54,549 DWT
- Length: 275 m (902 ft)
- Beam: 32 m (105 ft)
- Depth: 21.5 m (71 ft)
- Decks: 8
- Propulsion: 4 × B&W 7K98MCC diesels; combined 39,352 kW (52,772 hp)
- Speed: 24 knots (44 km/h)

MSC Carouge is a container ship built in 2007 by the Daewoo Mangalia Heavy Industries in Mangalia, Romania and currently operated by Mediterranean Shipping Company S.A. She is the third ship delivered to the Swiss company in a series of 12 ordered. The 54,549 DWT ship has a container capacity of 4,860 TEU's.
