= Monte Aconcagua (ship) =

Romania container ship

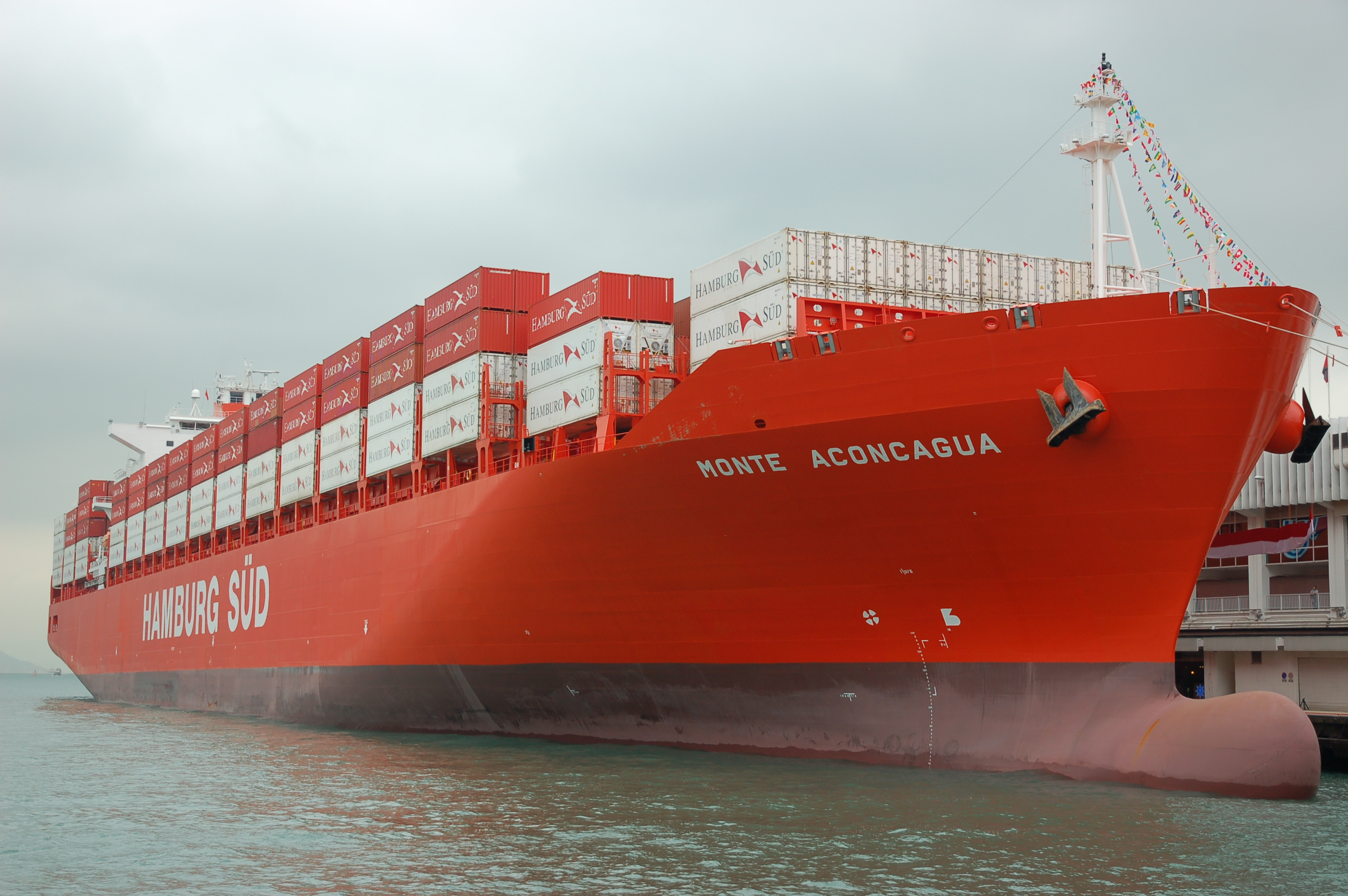
- Container ship Monte Aconcagua

History

Singapore
- Name: 2018–present: Monte Aconcagua
- Owner: A.P. Moller Singapore Pte. Ltd.
- Operator: Maersk Line AS
- Port of registry: Singapore 6 April 2018
- Route: Hamburg Süd North America East Coast - South America East Coast (ASUS) liner service
- Identification: IMO number: 9348077; MMSI number: 563052400; Callsign: 9V8405
- Status: In service

Germany
- Name: 2009–present: Monte Aconcagua
- Owner: 2009-2018: Monte Aconcagua GmbH & Co KG
- Operator: Columbus Shipmanagement GmbH C/O Hamburg Suedamerikanische Dampfschiffahrts-Gesellschaft KG
- Port of registry: Germany 3 January 2009
- Builder: Daewoo Mangalia Heavy Industries
- Laid down: 18 February 2008
- Launched: 23 November 2008
- Completed: 17 March 2009
- Identification: IMO number: 9348077

General characteristics
- Tonnage: 69,132 GT; 71,257 t DWT
- Length: 272 m (892 ft 5 in)
- Beam: 40 m (131 ft 3 in)
- Depth: 24.2 m (79 ft 5 in)
- Ice class: D0
- Installed power: Doosan Engine Co. Ltd. 8RTA96C
- Speed: 23 knots (43 km/h; 26 mph)

Monte Aconcagua is a container ship owned by A.P. Moller Singapore Pte. Ltd. and operated by Maersk Line AS. The 272-metre (892 ft) long ship was built at Daewoo Mangalia Heavy Industries in Mangalia, Romania in 2008/2009. Originally owned by Monte Alegre GmbH & Co KG, a subsidiary of Hamburg Süd, she has had two owners and been registered under two flags.

The vessel is one of ten ships of the Monte class built for Hamburg Süd by Daewoo Shipbuilding & Marine Engineering and Daewoo Mangalia Heavy Industries between 2004 and 2009.

== Construction ==
Monte Aconcagua had its keel laid down on 18 February 2008 at Daewoo Mangalia Heavy Industries in Mangalia, Romania. Its hull has an overall length of 272 metres (892 ft). In terms of width, the ship has a beam of 40 metres (130 ft). The height from the top of the keel to the main deck, called the moulded depth, is 24.2 metres (79 ft).

The ship's container-carrying capacity of 5,552 twenty-foot equivalent units (TEU) (5,552 20-foot shipping containers) places it in the range of a Post-Panamax container ship. The ship's gross tonnage, a measure of the volume of all its enclosed spaces, is 69,132. Its net tonnage, which measures the volume of the cargo spaces, is 34,823. Its total carrying capacity in terms of weight, is 71,257.16 long tons deadweight (DWT).

The vessel was built with a Doosan Engine Co. Ltd. 8RTA96C main engine, which drives a controllable-pitch propeller. The 8-cylinder engine has a Maximum Continuous Rating of 45,765 kW with 102 revolutions per minute at MCR. The cylinder bore is 960mm. The ship also features 4 main power distribution system HSJ7 907-10F auxiliary generators by Hyundai Heavy Ind. Co., Ltd. EES, 2 at 4,342.4-kilowatt (5,823.3 hp), and 2 at 3,257.1-kilowatt (4,367.8 hp). The vessel's steam piping system features an Aalborg CH 8-500 auxiliary boiler.

Construction of the ship was completed on 17 March 2009.
