= MSC Nuria =

Romanian container ship

History
- Name: MSC Nuria
- Owner: Mediterranean Shipping Company S.A.
- Operator: Mediterranean Shipping Company S.A.
- Port of registry: Panama City, Panama
- Ordered: 2005
- Builder: Daewoo Mangalia Heavy Industries, Mangalia, Romania
- Yard number: 4,065
- Launched: 6 April 2008
- Christened: 2008
- Completed: 2008
- In service: 2008-onwards
- Identification: IMO number: 9349825; MMSI number: 370273000; Callsign: 3ESE2
- Status: in service

General characteristics
- Tonnage: 54,549 DWT
- Length: 275 m (902 ft)
- Beam: 32 m (105 ft)
- Depth: 21.5 m (71 ft)
- Propulsion: 4 × B&W 7K98MCC diesels; combined 39,352 kW (52,772 hp)
- Speed: 24 knots (44 km/h)

MSC Nuria is a container ship built in 2008 by the Daewoo Mangalia Heavy Industries in Mangalia, Romania and currently operated by Mediterranean Shipping Company S.A. She is the largest container ship ever constructed in Romania. The 54,549 DWT ship has a container capacity of 4,860 TEU's.

The Mediterranean Shipping Company S.A. also had a previous ship called MSC Nuria built in 1977 as the Australian Venture and operated under Saint Kitts and Nevis flag that was discharged in 2006.
