= 2019 Philadelphia Packer Marine Terminal cocaine seizure =

Cocaine seizure

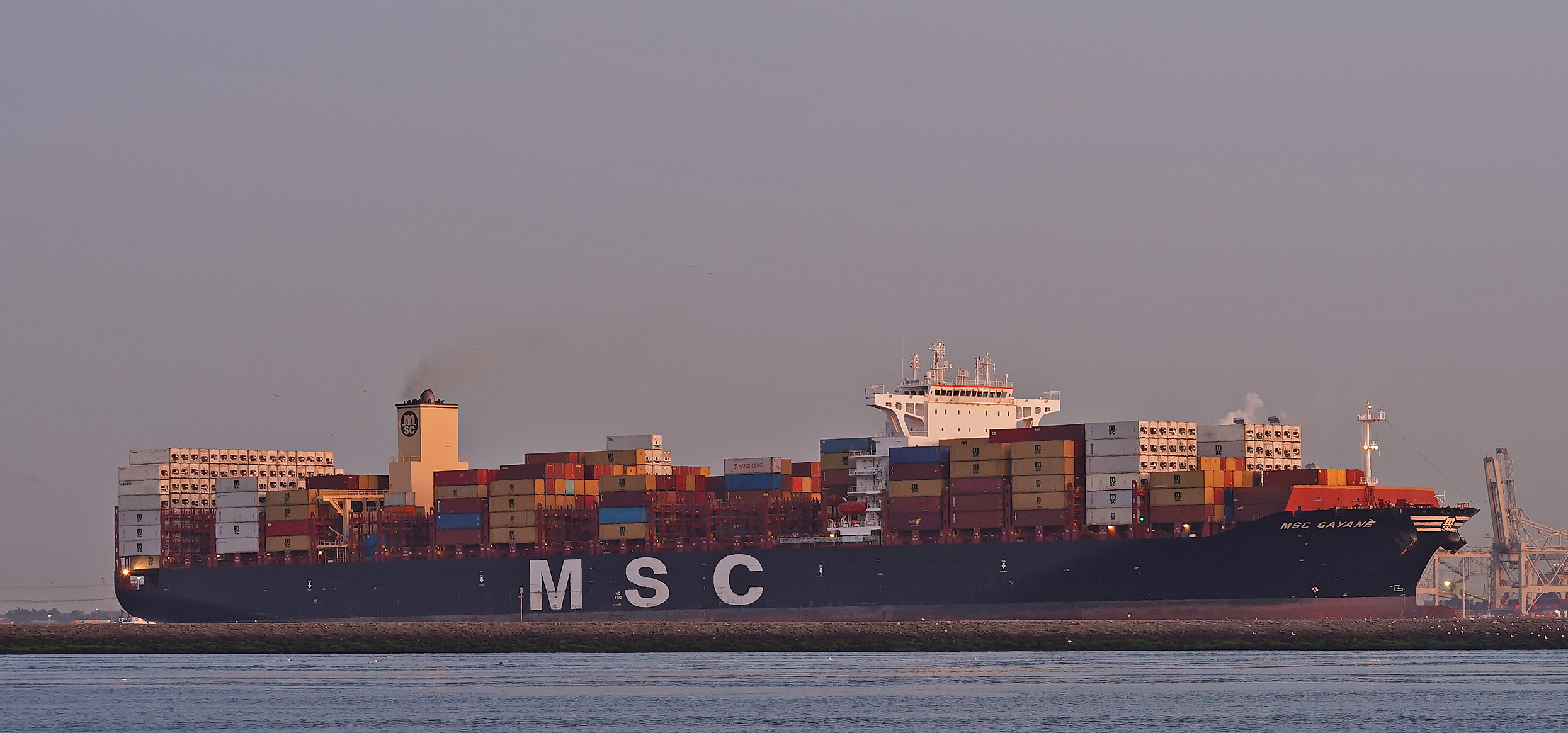
MSC Gayané in July 2019

On June 18, 2019, United States federal authorities seized 39,525 pounds (nearly twenty tons) of cocaine with a street value estimated at $1.3 billion (equivalent to more than $1.6 billion in 2025) at the Port of Philadelphia's Packer Marine Terminal. This was the largest cocaine seizure in U.S. Customs and Border Protection's 230-year history, the largest cocaine seizure in U.S. history, and the fourth largest worldwide.

== Background ==
The MSC Gayané (IMO number 9770763), operated by Mediterranean Shipping Company and owned by JPMorgan Chase, was heading from Chile to Rotterdam with a cargo of wine and nuts. It had previously stopped in Peru, Colombia and the Bahamas.

Authorities in the US and other countries had been monitoring MSC vessels for several years, suspecting that the company's crews had been infiltrated by members of the Balkan Cartel in order to facilitate cocaine smuggling into Europe. US authorities had boarded and searched several other MSC ships and were tracking the Gayané before it entered American waters.

== Seizure ==
MSC Gayané was met by law enforcement vessels and boarded by about a dozen federal agents while heading into Delaware Bay, then escorted into the Port of Philadelphia's Packer Marine Terminal. Once docked, authorities found nearly 20 tons of cocaine; eight members of her crew were charged. The U.S. Attorney General seized the Gayané until MSC posted a $50 million bond to release her.

== Prosecutions ==
By August 2021, all eight crew members charged with crimes had been sentenced. On October 31, 2022, former professional heavyweight boxer Goran Gogic was charged with three counts of violating the Maritime Drug Law Enforcement Act and one count of conspiracy thereof in relation to the MSC Gayané bust.

In December 2022, Bloomberg Businessweek reported that US customs authorities were attempting to get MSC to pay more than $700 million in penalties related to the seizure. The United States Attorney for the Eastern District of Pennsylvania was also reported to be preparing a civil case against MSC, arguing that they bore responsibility for the illegal cargo and should forfeit the Gayané or pay penalties amounting to a significant share of its value.
