= MSC Geneva =

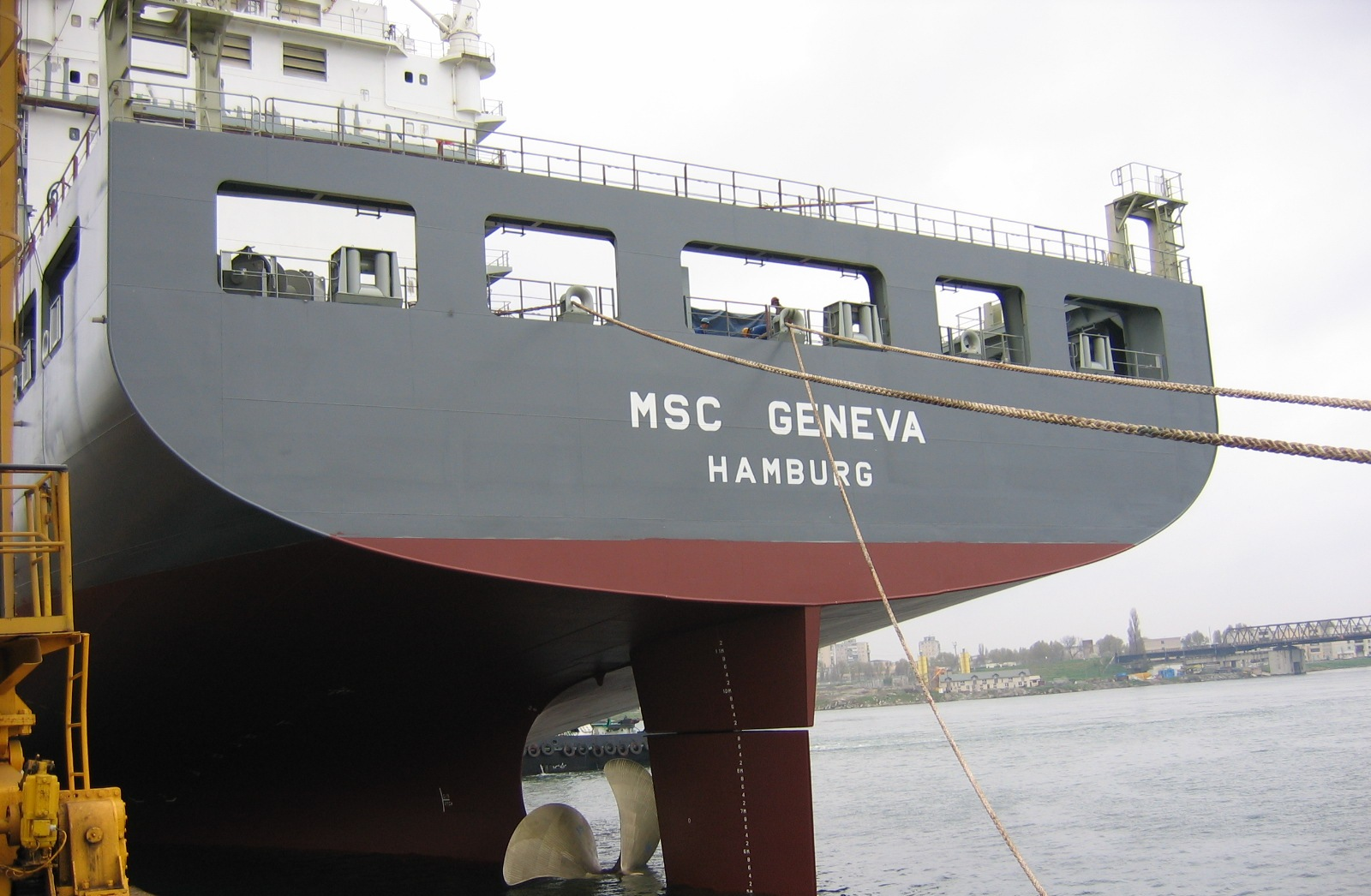
- MSC Geneva

History
- Name: MSC Geneva
- Owner: Reederei NSB, Buxtehude, Germany
- Operator: Mediterranean Shipping Company S.A.
- Port of registry: Hamburg, Germany
- Ordered: 2004
- Builder: Daewoo Mangalia Heavy Industries, Mangalia
- Yard number: 4,052
- Laid down: 2005
- Launched: 16 April 2006
- Christened: 2006
- Completed: 2006
- Identification: IMO number: 9320427; MMSI number: 255805618; Callsign: CQFQ
- Status: in service

General characteristics
- Class & type: Containership
- Tonnage: 54,549 DWT
- Length: 275 m (902 ft)
- Beam: 32 m (105 ft)
- Depth: 21.5 m (71 ft)
- Decks: 1
- Ice class: E Germanischer Lloyd
- Installed power: 39,352 kW (52,772 hp)
- Propulsion: 1 × B&W 7K98MCC diesel
- Speed: 24 knots (44 km/h)
- Capacity: 4865 TEU

MSC Geneva is a container ship built in 2006 by the Daewoo Mangalia Heavy Industries in Mangalia, Romania and currently operated by Mediterranean Shipping Company S.A. She is the first ship delivered to the Swiss company in a series of 12 ordered. The 54,549 DWT ship has a container capacity of 4,860 TEU.
