= Rio Blanco (ship) =

Romanian container ship

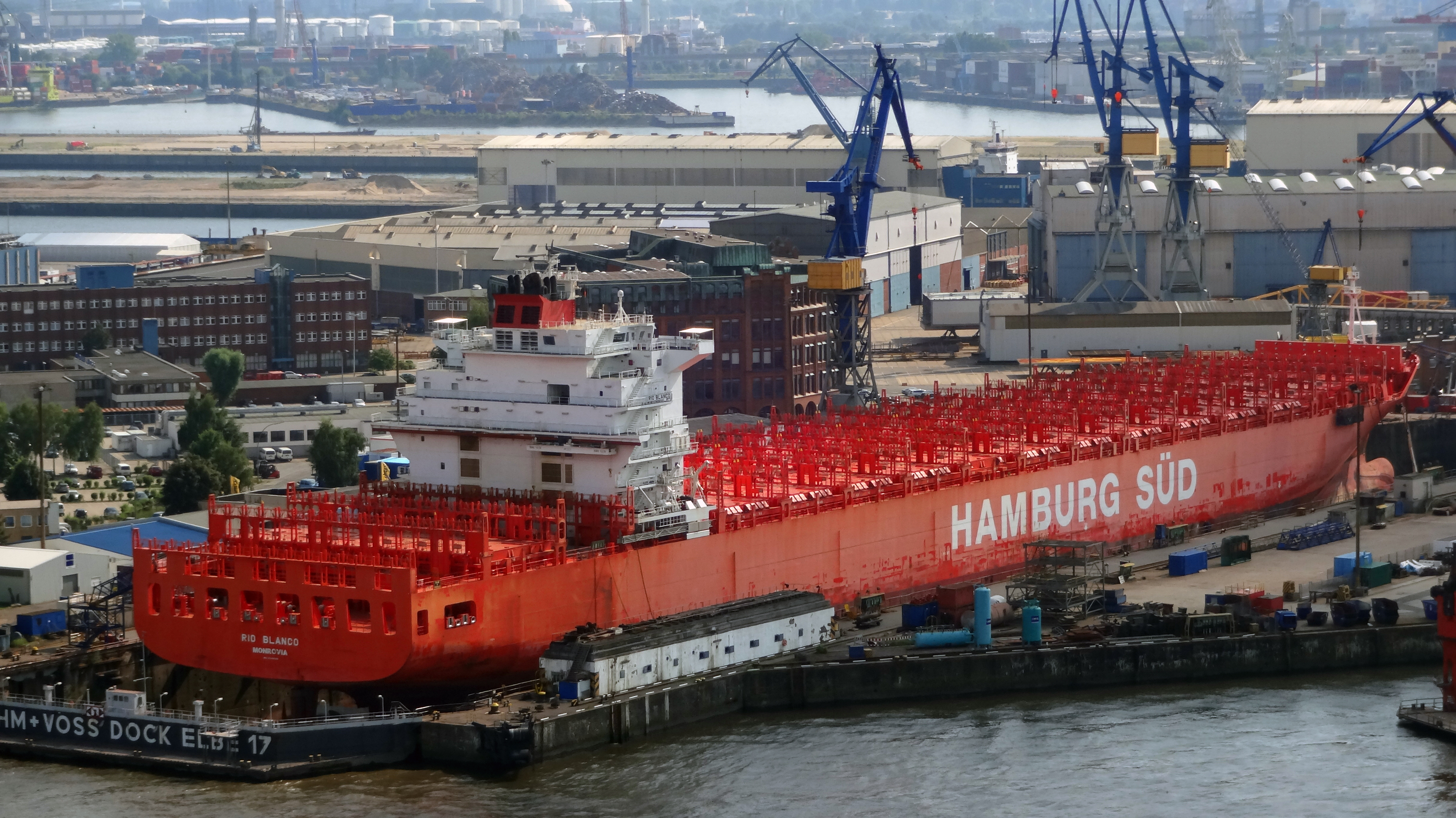
- Container ship Rio Blanco

History

Singapore
- Name: 2018–present: Rio Blanco
- Owner: A.P. Moller Singapore Pte. Ltd.
- Operator: Maersk Line AS
- Port of registry: Singapore as of 3 January 2018
- Route: Hamburg Süd Australia/New Zealand South East Asia (SENZ-Southern Loop) liner service
- Identification: IMO number: 9348089; MMSI number: 563050200; Callsign: 9V7177
- Status: In service

Liberia
- Name: 2012–present: Rio Blanco
- Owner: Rio Blanco GmbH & Co KG
- Operator: Columbus Shipmanagement GmbH C/O Hamburg Suedamerikanische Dampfschiffahrts-Gesellschaft KG
- Port of registry: Monrovia, Liberia as of 1 January 2012

Germany
- Name: 2009–present: Rio Blanco
- Owner: Rio Bravo GmbH & Co KG
- Operator: Columbus Shipmanagement GmbH C/O Hamburg Suedamerikanische Dampfschiffahrts-Gesellschaft KG
- Port of registry: Germany as of 6 March 2009
- Builder: Daewoo Mangalia Heavy Industries
- Laid down: 5 May 2008
- Launched: 14 February 2009
- Completed: 3 June 2009
- Identification: IMO number: 9348089

General characteristics
- Tonnage: 73,899 GT; 80,115.35 tonnes deadweight (DWT)
- Length: 286.45 m (939.8 ft)
- Beam: 40 m (131.2 ft)
- Depth: 24.2 m (79.4 ft)
- Ice class: D0
- Installed power: Doosan Engine Co. Ltd. 8RTA96CB
- Speed: 23 knots

Rio Blanco is a container ship owned by A.P. Moller Singapore Pte. Ltd. and operated by Maersk Line AS. The 286.45-metre (939.8 ft) long ship was built at Daewoo Mangalia Heavy Industries in Mangalia, Romania in 2009. Originally owned by Rio Blanco GmbH & Co KG, a subsidiary of Hamburg Süd, she has had two owners and been registered under three flags.

The vessel is one of three ships of the Rio class built for Hamburg Süd by Daewoo Mangalia Heavy Industries in 2009.

== Construction ==
Rio Blanco had its keel laid down on 5 May 2008 at Daewoo Mangalia Heavy Industries in Mangalia, Romania. Its hull has an overall length of 286.45 metres (939.8 ft). In terms of width, the ship has a beam of 40 metres (130 ft). The height from the top of the keel to the main deck, called the moulded depth, is 24.2 metres (79 ft).

The ship's container-carrying capacity of 5,908 twenty-foot equivalent units (TEU) (5,908 20-foot shipping containers) places it in the range of a Post-Panamax container ship. The ship's gross tonnage, a measure of the volume of all its enclosed spaces, is 73,899. Its net tonnage, which measures the volume of the cargo spaces, is 39,673. Its total carrying capacity in terms of weight, is 80,115.35 long tons deadweight (DWT).

The vessel was built with a Doosan Engine Co. Ltd. 8RTA96CB main engine, which drives a controllable-pitch propeller. The 8-cylinder engine has a Maximum Continuous Rating of 45,760 kW with 102 revolutions per minute at MCR. The cylinder bore is 960mm. The ship also features 4 main power distribution system auxiliary generators at 3,800-kilowatt (5,100 hp) each. The vessel's steam piping system features an Aalborg CH 8-500 auxiliary boiler.

Construction of the ship was completed on 3 June 2009.
