= MSC Sindy =

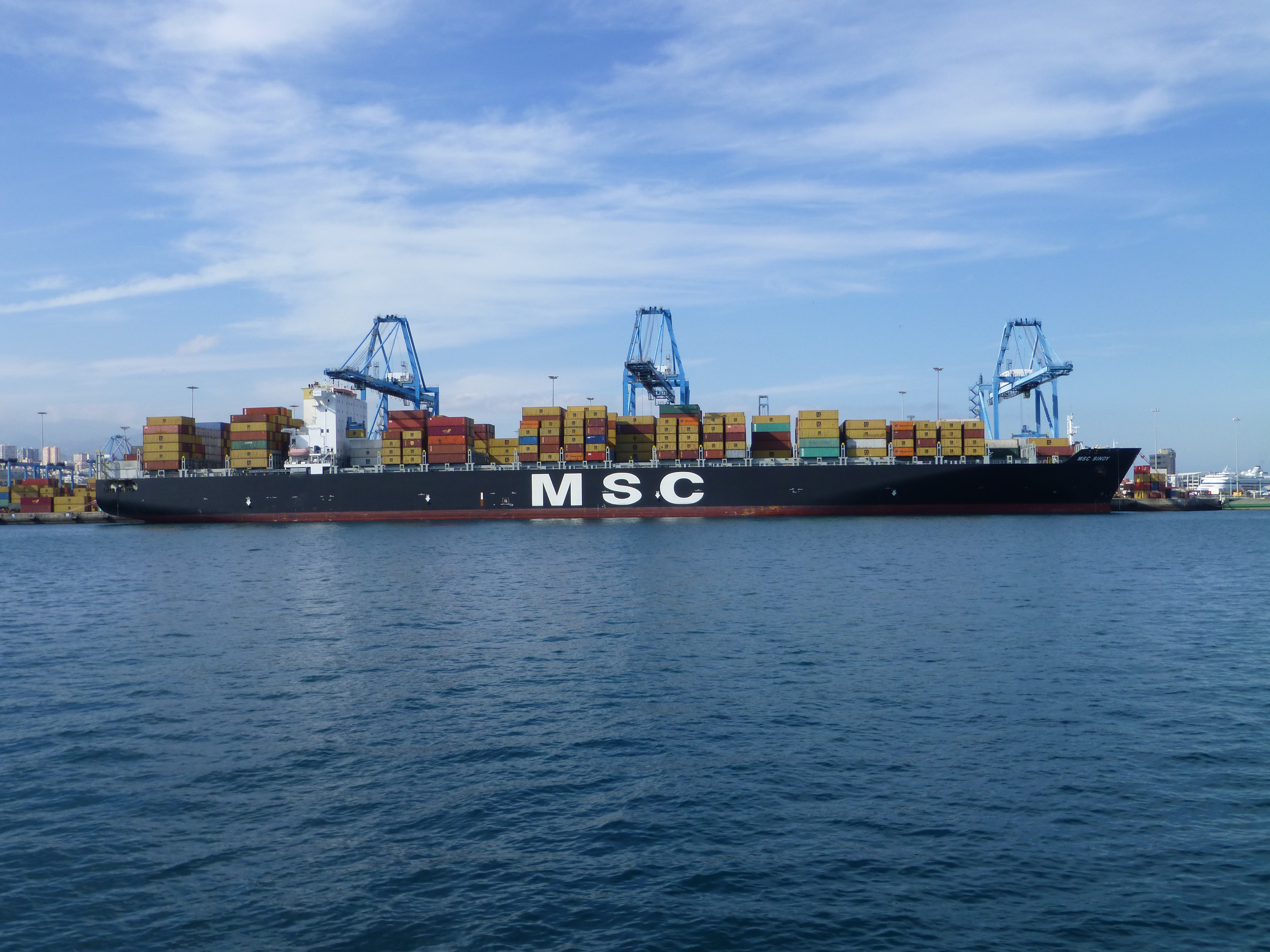
- MSC Sindy in Port of Las Palmas, Canary Islands, Spain.

History
- Name: MSC Sindy
- Owner: Compania Naviera Sylvana SA
- Operator: MSC Mediterranean Shipping Co SA
- Port of registry: Panama
- Builder: Samsung Heavy Industries Company
- Yard number: 1611
- Launched: 20 March 2007
- Completed: June 2007
- Identification: IMO number: 9336048; MMSI number: 372736000; Official No: 3287507; Callsign: 3EKJ3
- Status: In service

General characteristics
- Tonnage: 107,000 GT 115,000 DWT
- Length: 336 m (1,102 ft)
- Beam: 43 m (141 ft)
- Draught: 15 m (49 ft)
- Depth: 27 m (88 ft) (moulded)
- Installed power: 68,519kW, 93,158hp
- Propulsion: 1 oil engine
- Speed: 25 kn
- Capacity: 9580 TEU

MSC Sindy is a container ship operated by the Mediterranean Shipping Company. She was built by Samsung Heavy Industries and sails under the flag of Panama.

== Hull and engine ==
MSC Sindy is owned by Compania Naviera Sylvana and operated by Mediterranean Shipping Co. (MSC) It was built by the Samsung Heavy Industries Company and its yard number was 1611. The ship has a beam of 43 metres (141 ft) and a length of 336 metres (1,102 ft). It has a draught of 15 metres (49 ft) and a moulded depth of 27m. MSC Sindy is the sister ship to the MSC Bruxelles.

MSC Sindy uses a 12-cylinder, two-stroke oil engine developing 68,519 kilowatts (91,885 shp) and driving a single propeller. The ship has 4 auxiliary generators, each rated at 2,950 kW.

MSC Sindy can carry under 9,580 TEUs, 700 of which may be refrigerated containers. This means the ship can carry 9,580 twenty-foot containers.

While being built, MSC Sindy went through 3 different names. Originally it was called MSC Sylvan. However, the summer before it was completed, it was changed to MSC Rosalba. Later that year it was again changed to MSC Sindy.
