= Benedetta-class container ship =

Container ship class

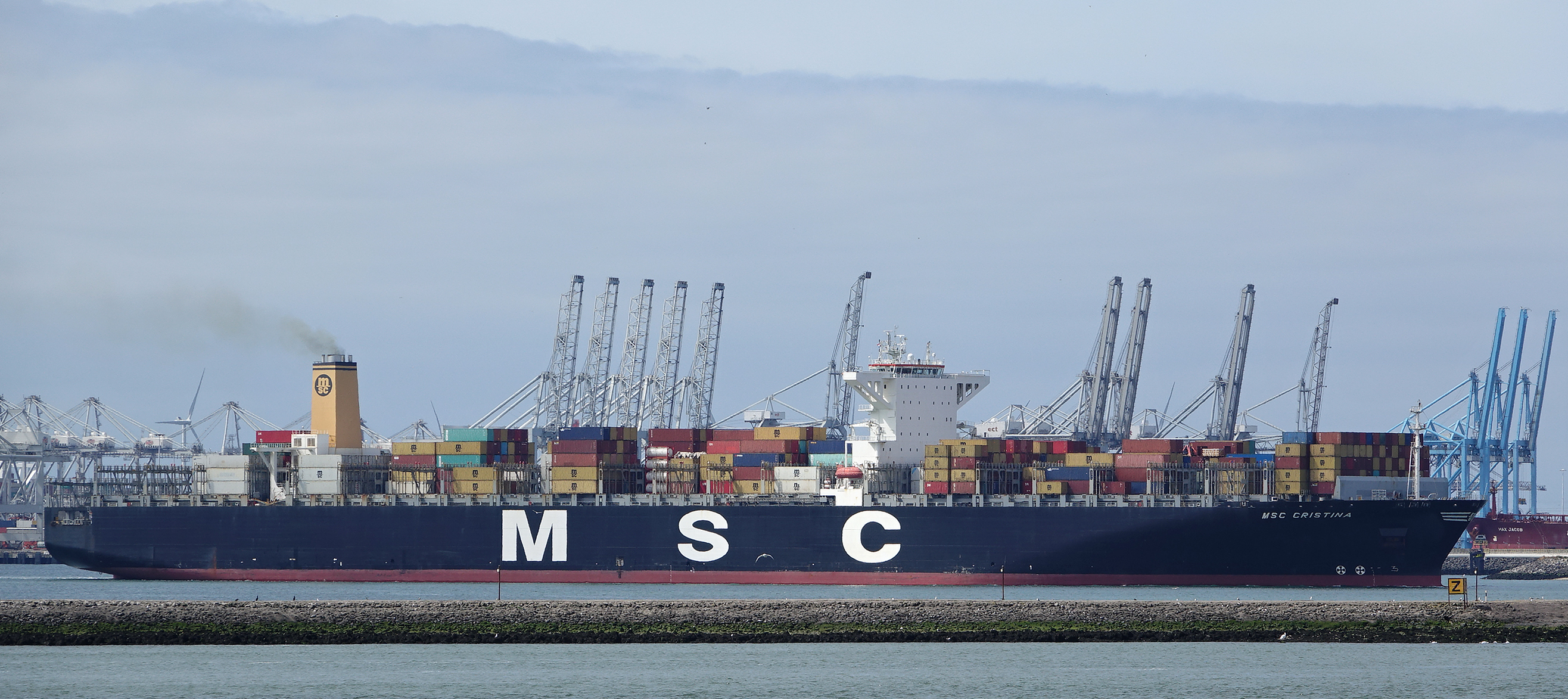
- MSC Cristina in the port of Rotterdam

Class overview
- Builders: Hyundai Heavy Industries
- Operators: Mediterranean Shipping Company
- In service: 2011–present
- Planned: 8
- Completed: 8
- Active: 8

General characteristics
- Type: Container ship
- Tonnage: 141,635 GT
- Length: 366.5 m (1,202 ft 5 in)
- Beam: 48.3 m (158 ft 6 in)
- Draught: 16 m (52 ft 6 in)
- Capacity: 13,100 TEU

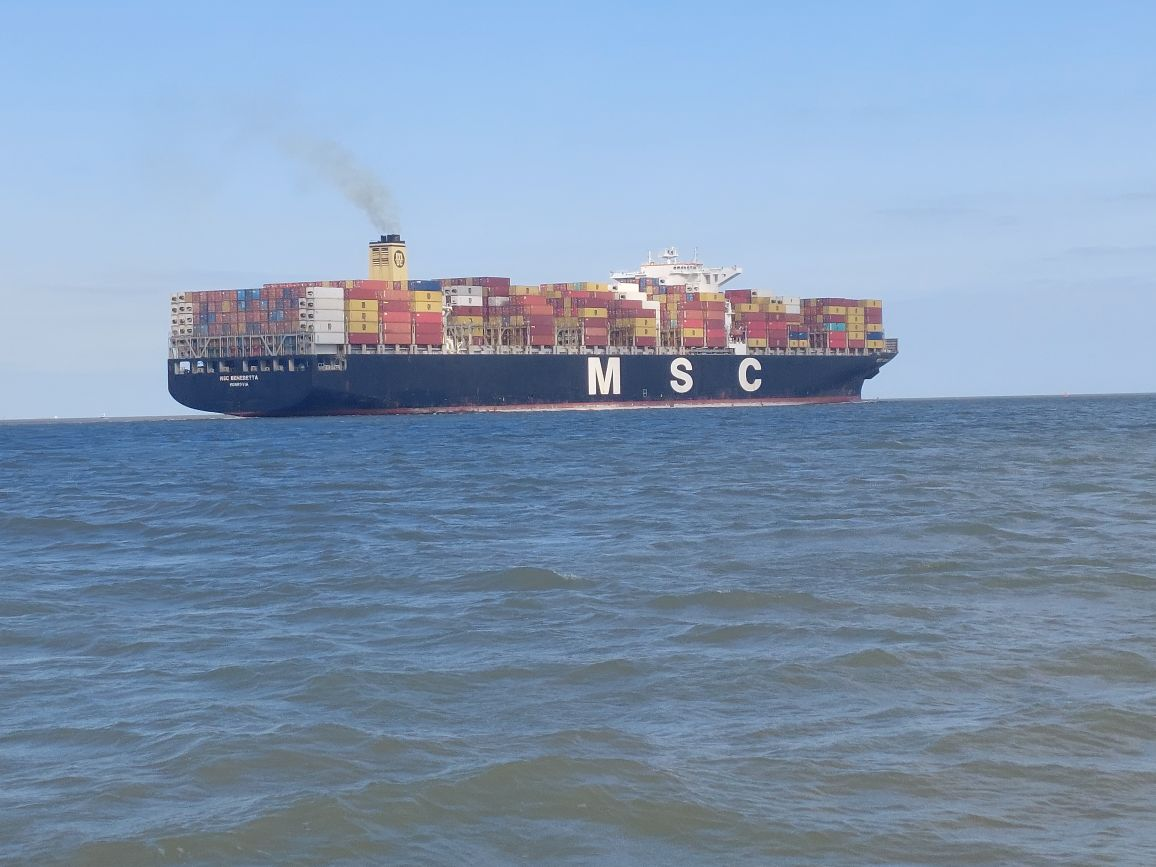
MSC Benedetta at Felixstowe, England

The Benedetta class is a series of eight container ships built for E.R. Schiffahrt by Hyundai Heavy Industries in South Korea. All eight ships were chartered to Mediterranean Shipping Company (MSC). The ships have a maximum theoretical capacity of around 13,100 twenty-foot equivalent units (TEU).

== List of ships ==
Ship	Previous names	Yard number	IMO number	Delivery	Status	ref
MSC Benedetta		2155	9465253	29 Nov 2011	In service	
MSC Cristina		2154	9465241	20 Dec 2011	In service	
MSC Vega		2156	9465265	11 Jan 2012	In service	
MSC Altair		2157	9465277	1 Mar 2012	In service	
MSC Capella		2164	9465289	5 Mar 2012	In service	
MSC Regulus		2165	9465291	21 May 2012	In service	
MSC Renée		2166	9465306	24 May 2012	In service	
MSC Margrit	CMA CGM Margrit (2012-2015)	2167	9465318	29 Jun 2012	In service	
