= Mediterranean Shipping Company =

Swiss international shipping line

MSC Mediterranean Shipping Company S.A.

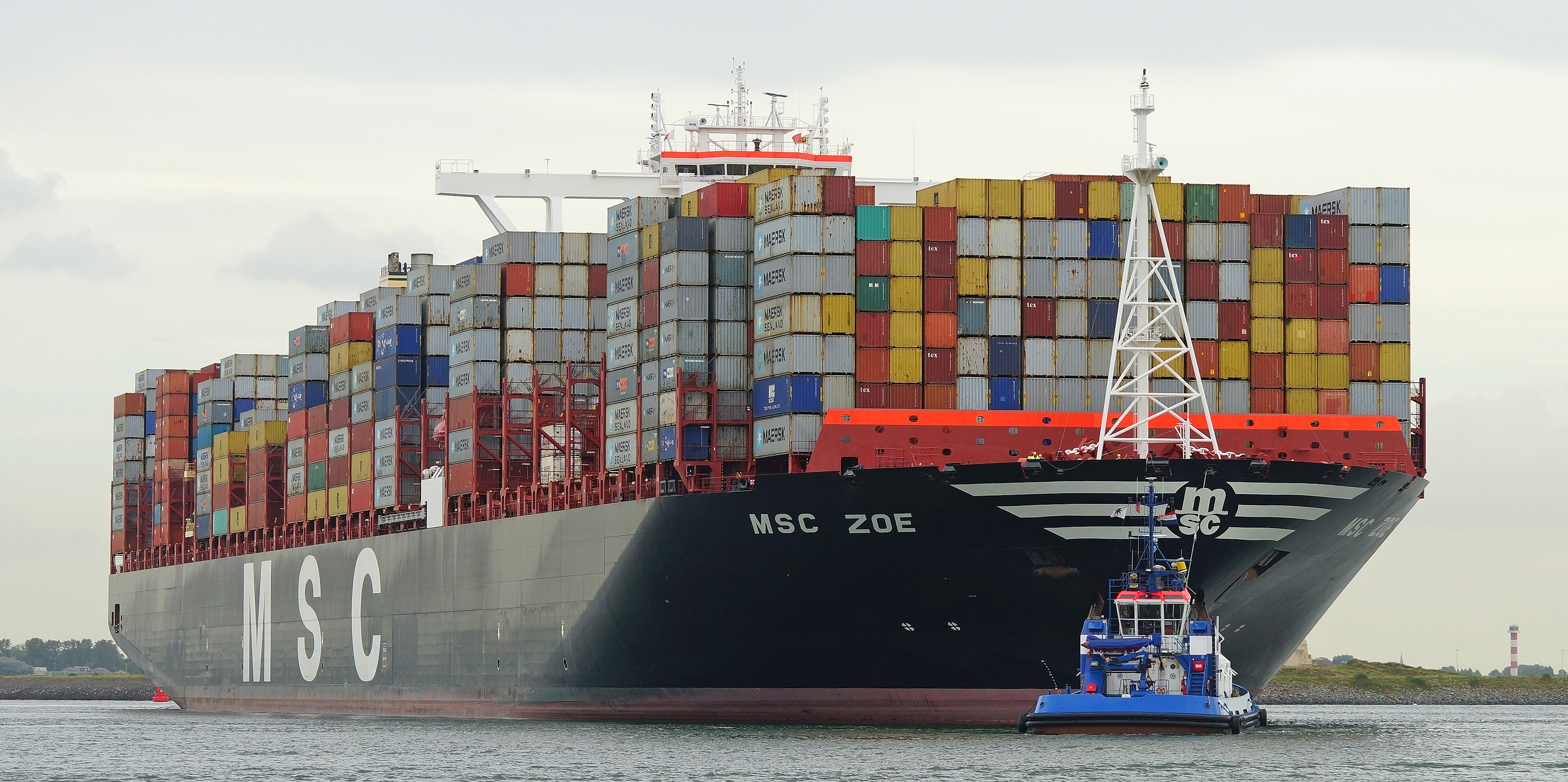
- Type: Private
- Industry: Shipping, air cargo, rail transport
- Founded: 1970; 56 years ago Naples, Italy
- Founder: Gianluigi Aponte
- Headquarters: Geneva, Switzerland
- Area served: Worldwide
- Key people: Gianluigi Aponte (Executive Chairman); Diego Aponte (Group President); Alexa Aponte Vago (Group CFO); Soren Toft (CEO)
- Services: Container shipping and logistics
- Revenue: ▲€86.4 billion (2022)
- Net income: ▲€36.2 billion (2022)
- Owner: Diego Aponte, Alexa Aponte Vago
- Number of employees: ▲200,000+ (2025)
- Website: www.msc.com

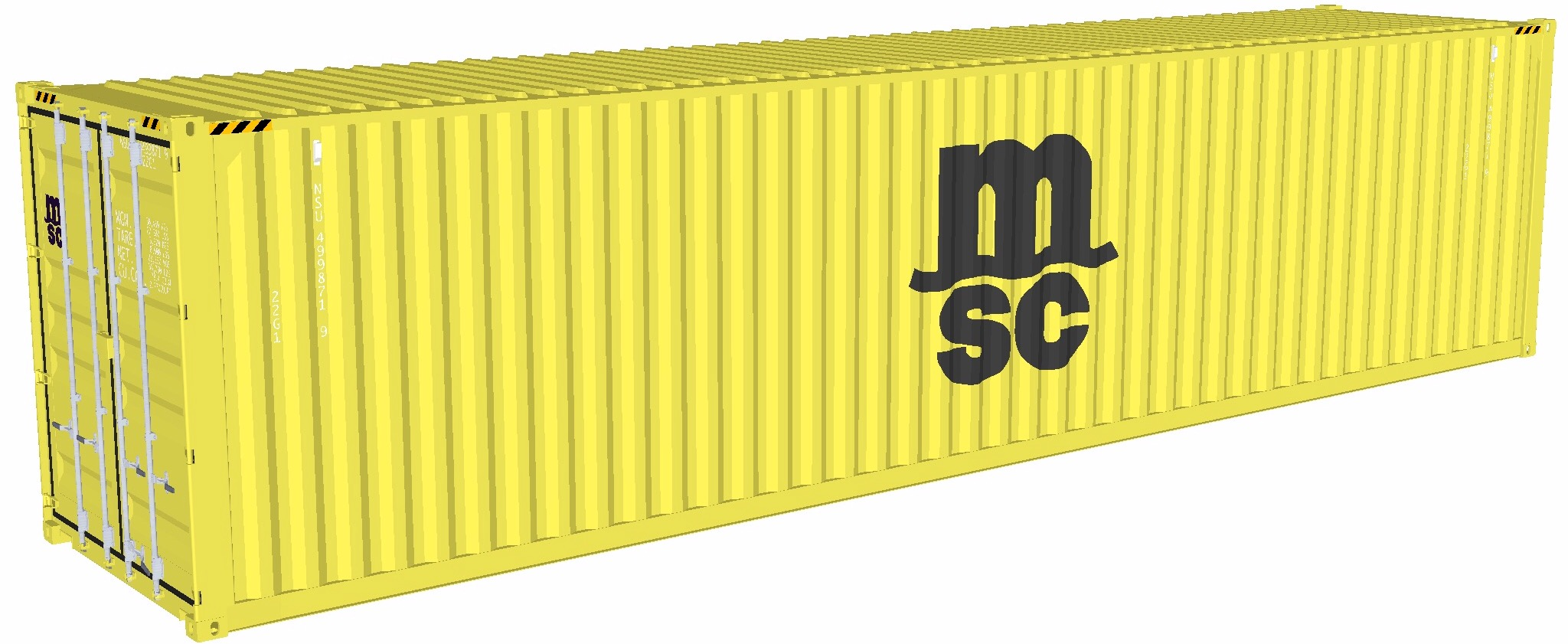
MSC 40' container

Mediterranean Shipping Company S.A., branded as MSC, is an international shipping line part of MSC Group. It was founded by Italian entrepreneur Gianluigi Aponte and his wife Rafaela Aponte-Diamant in Italy in 1970. The company is owned by the Aponte-Diamant family with its headquarters in the suburb of Champel, Geneva, Switzerland, since 1978. It is the world's largest container shipping company by both fleet size and cargo capacity, controlling 21.2% of global container capacity as of November 2025.

As of September 2025, MSC operates about 900 cargo vessels with an intake capacity of 7,000,000 twenty-foot equivalent units (TEU). MSC subsidiaries operate rail freight transport in Portugal and Spain, cruise ships, and cargo aircraft.

The company is independent and wholly owned by the Aponte-Diamant family under the leadership of Diego Aponte. Diego was appointed president and CEO by his father and company founder Gianluigi in October 2014. In December 2020, Soren Toft became MSC chief executive officer.

== History ==
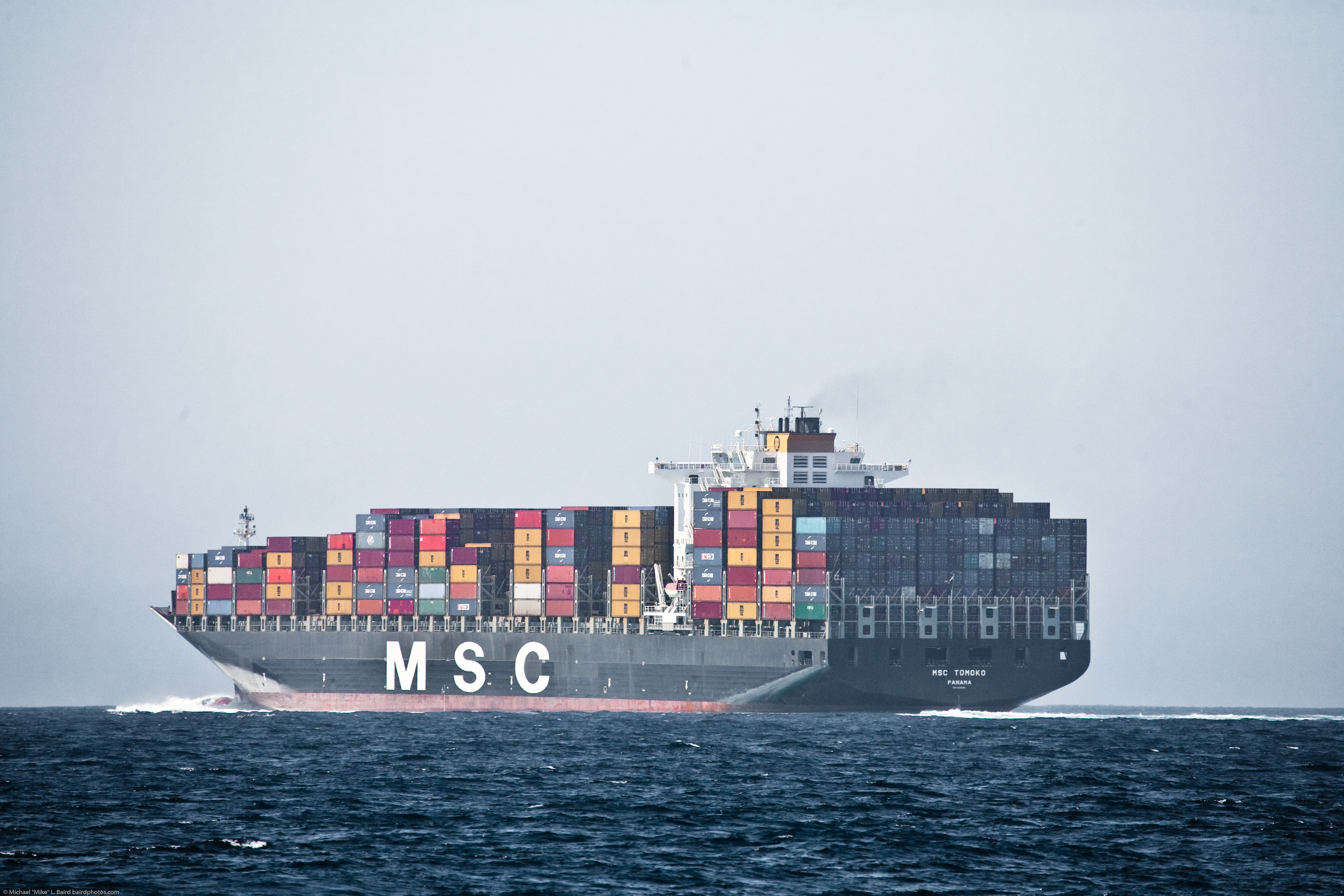
MSC Tomoko in the Santa Barbara Channel, 2009

Mediterranean Shipping Company was founded in Naples in 1970 as a private company by seafaring captain Gianluigi Aponte and Rafaela Aponte-Diamant, when they bought their first ship, Patricia, followed by Rafaela, with which Aponte began a shipping line operating between the Mediterranean and Somalia. The line subsequently expanded through the purchase of second-hand cargo ships. By 1977, the company operated services to northern Europe, Africa and the Indian Ocean.

In 1978, the headquarters was established in Geneva, Switzerland. The expansion continued through the 1980s; by the end of the decade, MSC operated ships to North America and Australia.

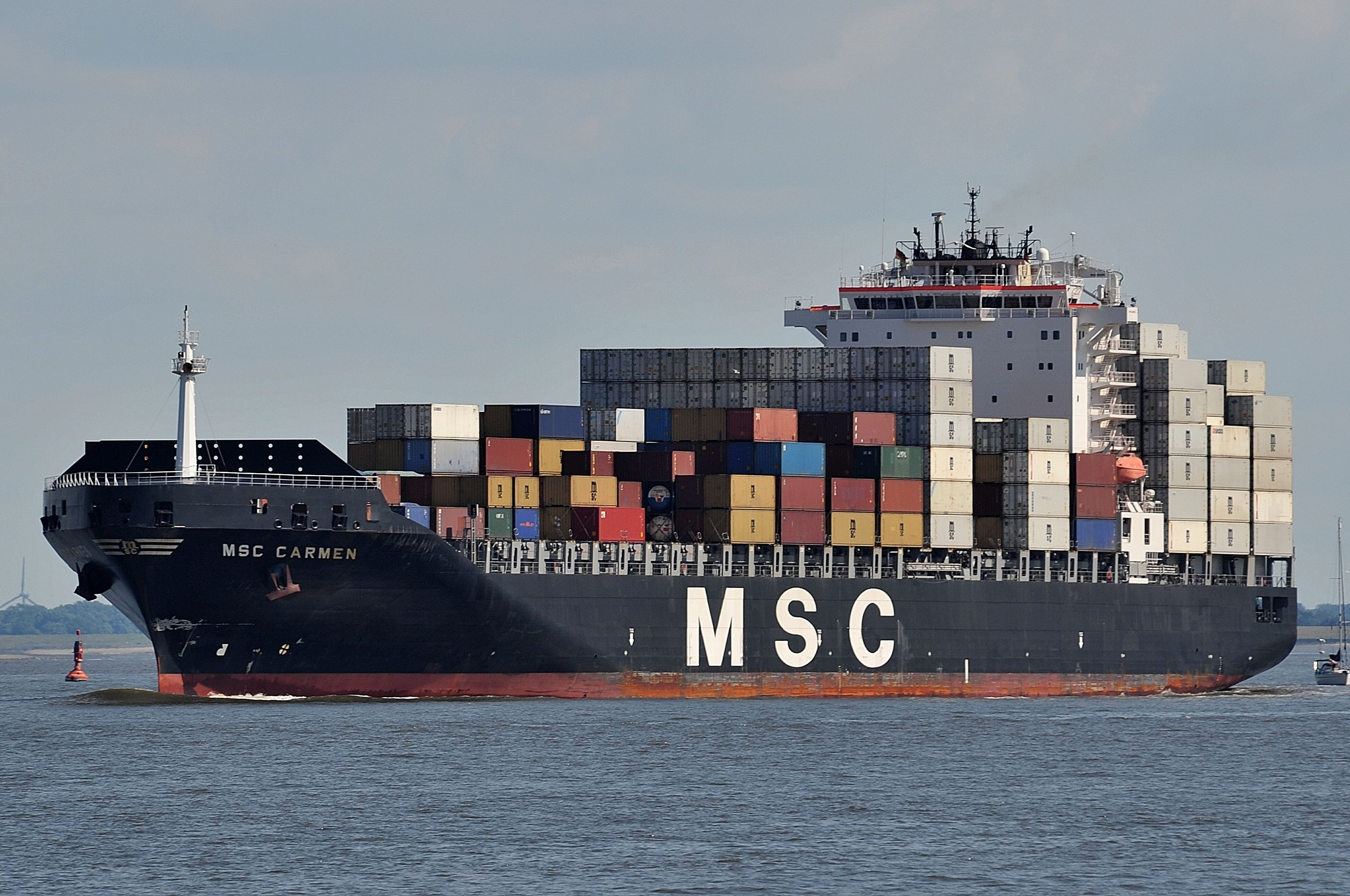
MSC Carmen

In 1988, MSC entered the cruise business by buying the liner Monterey. In 1989, they purchased Lauro Lines. The new company was named StarLauro Cruises and had 2 ships, Monterey and Achille Lauro. In 1994, the company ordered its first newly constructed container ships, which were delivered beginning in 1996 with MSC Alexa. They were built by Italian shipbuilder, Fincantieri. In 1995, StarLauro Cruises was renamed MSC Cruises.

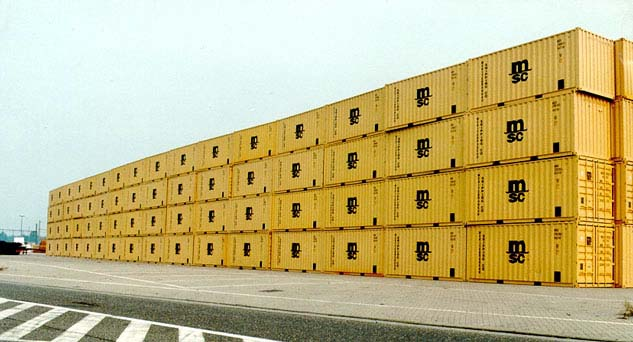
MSC containers

In October 2014, Diego Aponte (son of MSC founder Gianluigi Aponte) was named president and chief executive of MSC, taking over from his father who was named group executive chairman. Gianluigi Aponte would continue to oversee all group related activities as well as supporting Diego in shaping the future of MSC. In December 2014, the MSC shipping line were ranked number 6 in Lloyd's List of Top 100 Most Influential People in Shipping.

In January 2015, MSC launched the world largest container ship, MSC Oscar, with a capacity of 19,224 TEU. Built by Daewoo Shipbuilding & Marine Engineering and registered in Panama, it joined the Albatross service in January as part of the 2M VSA (Vessel Sharing Agreement between Maersk Line and MSC). In June 2015 Maersk and MSC signed a vessel-sharing agreement on the Asia-Europe, trans-Pacific and trans-Atlantic trades. The agreement is referred to as the 2M Alliance. The 2M Alliance includes 185 vessels with an estimated capacity of 2.1 million TEU, deployed on 21 strings.

In February 2017, MSC purchased a 49% stake into Messina Line, an Italian shipping Line founded in Genoa, Italy in 1929, specialised in intra Mediterranean short sea, and Europe to East and West Africa routes. The company owns 8 Roll-on/roll-off vessels and a Terminal in Genoa port, on top of a container fleet of 65,000 TEU.

In October 2018, MSC decided to charter out the only two car carriers in its fleet (MSC Immacolata and MSC Cristiana) to Grimaldi Group, replacing them on the service towards West Africa with two Messina Line – ConRO vessels: MSC Cobalto (formerly Jolly Cobalto) and MSC Titanio (formerly Jolly Titanio). The swap of these ships, that were previously deployed on MSC Adriatic Trade in between the ports of Trieste and İzmir, results in view of a tighter collaboration between MSC and Messina Line.

In July 2019, MSC launched the largest container ship in the world at the time, the 23,756 TEU MSC Gülsün, built by Samsung Heavy Industries.

In December 2020, Søren Toft became MSC Chief Executive Officer. Søren Toft is the first person outside the Aponte family to become CEO. He would report directly to Diego Aponte, MSC Group President, and Gianluigi Aponte, founder and MSC Group Chairman. Søren Toft also became a member of the board of directors of Terminal Investment Ltd.

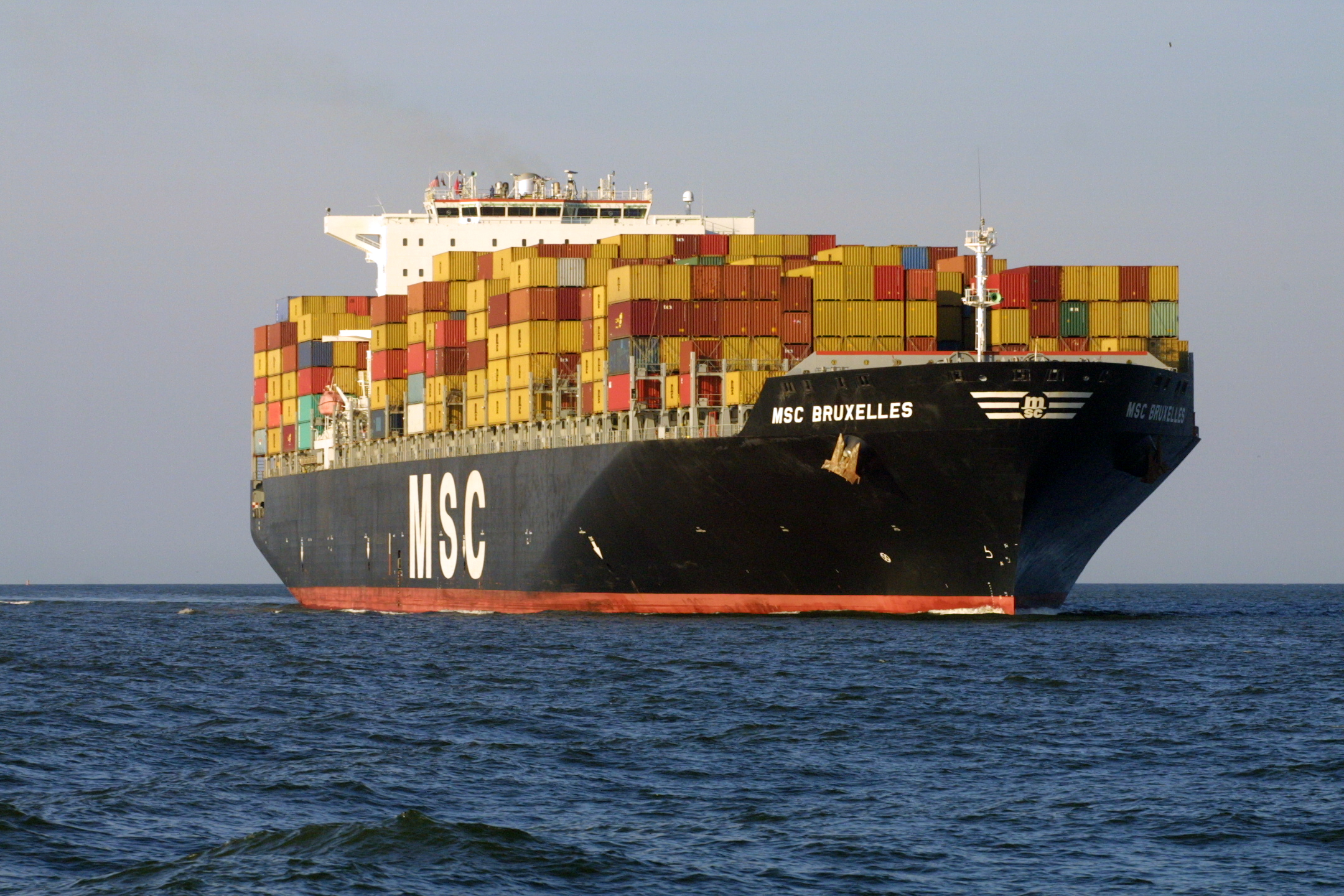
MSC Bruxelles

In January 2021, MSC was awarded the "Maritime Sustainability Passport" (MSP) Certificate and Seal by the North American Marine Environment Protection Association (NAMEPA). NAMEPA's co-founder/executive director Carleen Lyden Walker stated that "By qualifying for NAMEPA's Maritime Sustainability Passport, MSC has demonstrated its commitment to stewardship of the environment, care for its employees, and responsible corporate governance".

In April 2021, MSC launched a special shipping service to help the distribution of pharmaceutical products during the COVID-19 pandemic. In August 2021, Gary Keville Transport Limited obtained temporary High Court order lifting an embargo preventing it from collecting and delivering containers from Dublin port. In December 2021, MSC was reported to offer at least 5.7 billion euros for Bolloré Africa Logistics, a subsidiary of the Bolloré Logistics. Later in December 2022, it was announced MSC had completed the acquisition of Bolloré Africa Logistics.

In December 2021, MSC acquired a 67% stake in the Brazilian domestic carrier Log-In Logistica.

On 6 January 2022, MSC became the largest container shipping company in the world, surpassing Maersk, in terms of TEU capacity, according to the latest Alphaliner's figures.

In 2022, MSC launched a cargo airline, MSC Air Cargo.

In March 2023, the company broke the record of biggest container ship in the world two times in a row by receiving the 24,116 TEU MSC Tessa mega container ship on 10 March and the 24,345 TEU MSC Irina mega container ship on 13 March.

In October 2023, MSC acquired a 50% stake in Italian passenger rail group NTV.

In March 2024, it was announced the MSC subsidiary Shipping Agencies Services (SAS) had reached agreement to acquire a 42% stake in the Lyon headquartered air and sea transport engineering and overseas forwarding and logistics company, Clasquin Group. That same month MSC acquired the Il Secolo XIX newspaper group.

In June 2024, MSC took a 15% stake in Genoa airport.

In July 2024, MSC complete its $698 million acquisition of Norway's Gram Car Carriers.

In September 2024, subsidiary company Medlog acquired UK based haulier, Maritime Transport.

In October 2024, MSC acquired 56.47% of the Brazilian port and maritime logistics operator Wilson Sons.

In November 2024, MSC acquired 49.9% of Hamburger Hafen und Logistik AG, the Hamburg port main terminal operator.

In early 2025, as part of a strategic alliance, MSC agreed to acquire a 49% stake in Spanish towage company Bolude Towage through the contribution of its subsidiary MedTug.

Also in 2025, MSC launched iReefer, a digital container monitoring platform, to provide customers with live data on temperature, humidity, and other conditions for refrigerated cargo. MSC stated that the platform was intended to support efficiency and "traceability" in the transport of perishable goods.

In April 2026, it was announced that the Aponte family had completed a transfer of ownership of the company from founder Gianluigi Aponte to his two children, Diego Aponte and Alexa Aponte Vago. Similar to their parents, the heirs are Italian nationals and Swiss residents, and hold leadership roles with Diego, who serves as Group President, and Alexa, who serves as Group Chief Financial Officer. Gianluigi Aponte will remain as Executive Chairman.

== Operations ==
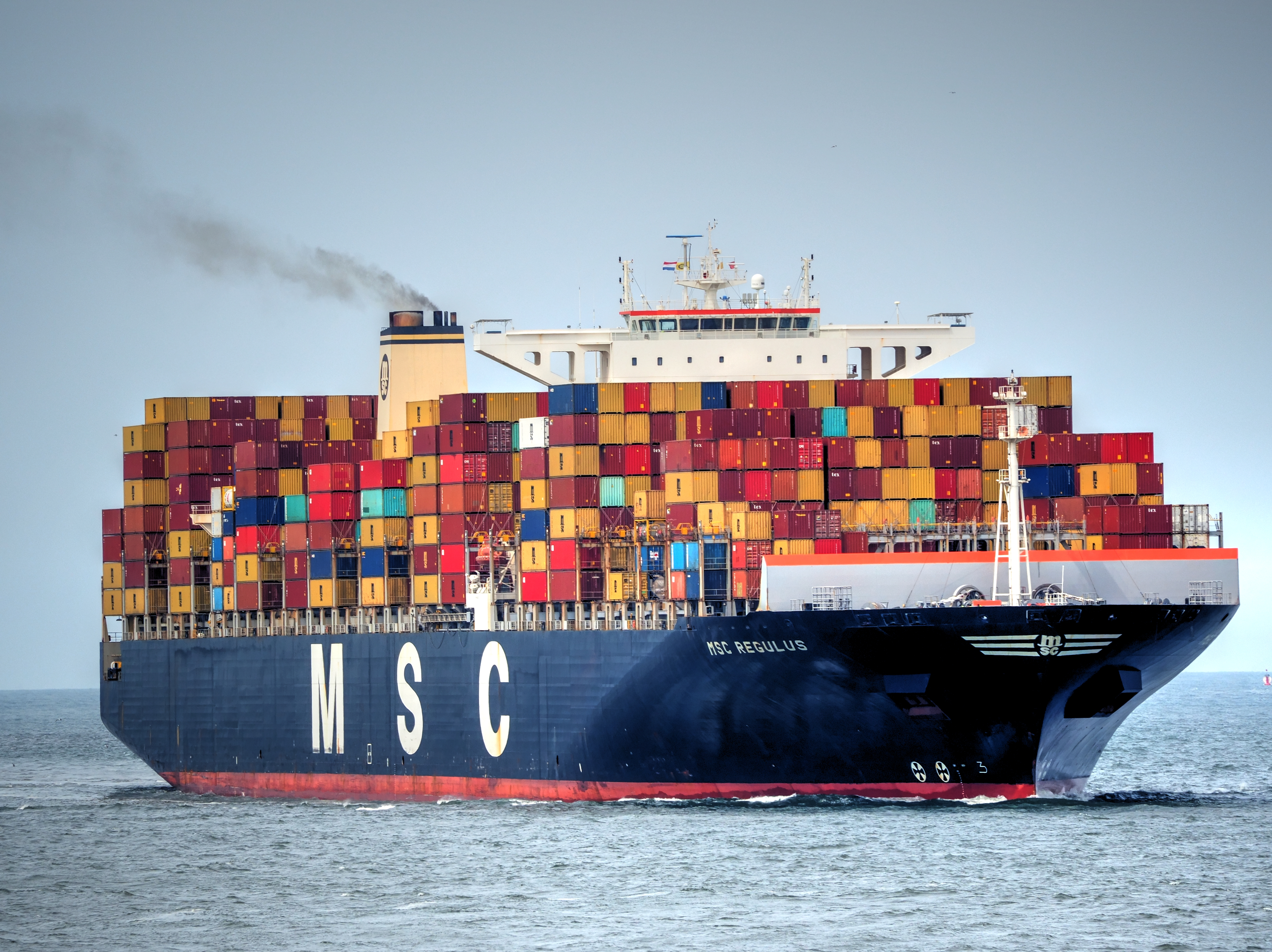
MSC Regulus

MSC operates 524 offices in 155 countries with its headquarters in Geneva, Switzerland and has over 200,000 employees. MSC's shipping line sails on more than 215 trade routes, calling at over 500 ports. As of August 2023, it operates vessels with a capacity of up to 24,346 TEU, including the world's largest container ships such as MSC Turkiye and MSC Michel Cappellini.

=== MSC Cruises ===
Since 1989, MSC has owned the holiday cruise division MSC Cruises.

MSC Cruises is the third-largest cruise company in the world, after Carnival Corporation & plc and Royal Caribbean Group, with a 10% share of all passengers carried in 2025.

=== Medway ===
In 2015, MSC started train operations by taking over the cargo division of Comboios de Portugal, and operates container trains over the Iberian peninsula. Its rail operations have later expanded to Italy and beyond, under the name Medway.

In October 2023, MSC acquired a 50% stake in Italo.

=== MSC Air Cargo ===
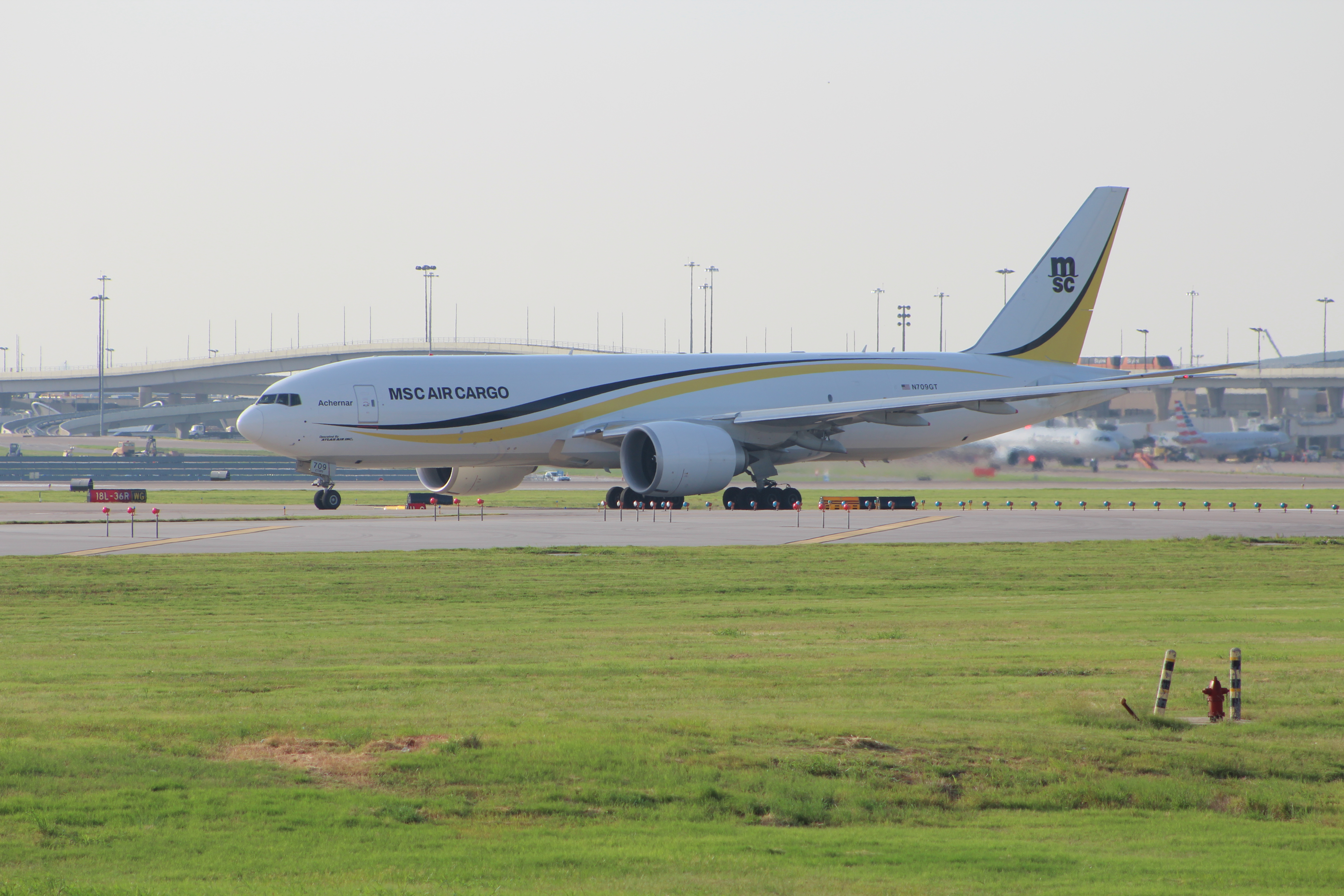
MSC Air Cargo Boeing 777F taxis at Dallas Fort Worth International Airport in 2024

In late 2022, MSC launched a virtual cargo airline under the MSC Air Cargo brand, ordering four Boeing 777F cargo aircraft; revenue flights commenced in December 2022 and the second aircraft was delivered in July 2023. Although MSC owns the aircraft and they are painted in MSC livery, they are operated under contract by Atlas Air.

In August 2023, MSC announced the purchase of a majority share of Italian cargo carrier AlisCargo Airlines, which began flights in 2021 and previously operated four Boeing 777 freighters. AlisCargo suspended operations and voluntarily withdrew its air operator's certificate (AOC) in 2022 due to declining air cargo rates, which made freighter operation increasingly uneconomical, along with the expiration of a temporary European Union Aviation Safety Agency rule allowing cargo carriage on the main decks of passenger aircraft. AlisCargo had a new 777F scheduled for delivery in 2024 and applied for a new AOC; once the new aircraft and the AOC were obtained, MSC said that AlisCargo would be merged into MSC Air Cargo, and MSC Air Cargo will operate flights independently from Atlas Air.

In May 2024, MSC Air Cargo announced that it had taken delivery of the fifth 777F and that independent operations would soon commence under the new Italian AOC.

In March 2026, MSC took delivery of its third Italian-registered Boeing 777-200 freighter, growing the company's fleet to a total of seven aircraft. This delivery coincides with the expansion of the company's Italian network. Alongside the already operational hub in Milan Malpensa, MSC Air Cargo is preparing to launch intercontinental cargo services from Rome Fiumicino.

=== TiL ===
Terminal Investment Ltd. (TiL), is the port operator 70% owned by the Mediterranean Shipping Co, 20% by Global Infrastructure Partners and 10% by GIC. It manages 45 port terminals on behalf of MSC.

Port assets
City	Country	Port (Terminal)	Ownership
Aarhus	Denmark	Port of Aarhus (Ominterminal new container terminal)	
Abu Dhabi	United Arab Emirates	Khalifa Port (Abu Dhabi Terminal)	
Antwerp	Belgium	Port of Antwerp (MSC PSA European Terminal)	Joint venture between TiL and PSA
Ashdod	Israel	Port of Ashdod (Ashdod South Port)	
Tekirdağ	Turkey	Asyaport (Asyaport Container Terminal)	
Baltimore	United States	Port of Baltimore (Sparrows Point Container Terminal)	
Bremerhaven	Germany	Port of Bremerhaven (MSC Gate Bremerhaven)	
Buenos Aires	Argentina	Port of Buenos Aires (Exolgan Terminal)	
Callao	Peru	Port of Callao (Callao Port Terminal)	
Colon	Panama	Panama Canal Container Port (PCCP Container Terminal)	
Fort Lauderdale	United States	Port Everglades (Port Everglades Terminal)	
Freeport	Bahamas	Freeport Harbor (Freeport Container Terminal)	
Gioia Tauro	Italy	Port of Gioia Tauro (Medcenter Container Terminal)	
Hamburg	Germany	Port of Hamburg (Container Terminal Altenwerder)	49.9% of the HHLA port terminal operator
Hamburg	Germany	Port of Hamburg (Container Terminal Burchardkai)	49.9% of the HHLA port terminal operator
Hamburg	Germany	Port of Hamburg (Container Terminal Tollerort)	49.9% of the HHLA port terminal operator
Houston	United States	Port of Houston (Barbours Cut Container Terminal)	
İstanbul	Turkey	Port of Ambarli (Marport Terminal)	
İskenderun	Turkey	İskenderun Harbor (Assan Port İskenderun)	
Klaipėda	Lithuania	Port of Klaipeda (JSSC Klaipedos Smelte)	
La Possession	France	Port of La Réunion (Port Réunion Est)	
Las Palmas	Spain	Port of Las Palmas (OPC Container Terminal)	
Le Havre	France	Port of Le Havre (Terminaux de Normandie)	100%
Le Havre	France	Port of Le Havre (Terminaux Porte Océane)	100%
Liverpool	United Kingdom	Port of Liverpool (Liverpool2)	
Long Beach	United States	Port of Long Beach (TTI Long Beach)	
Lomé	Togo	Port of Lomé (Lomé Container Terminal)	50%
Montreal	Canada	Port of Montreal (Contrecœur container terminal)	
Ningbo	China	Port of Ningbo (Ningbo Gangji Terminal)	
King Abdullah	Saudi Arabia	King Abdullah Port (National Container Terminals)	
Marseille	France	Marseille-Fos Port (Fos 2XL)	
Mundra	India	Mundra Port (Adani Ennore Container Terminal )	
Navegantes	Brazil	Port of Navegantes (Portonave Container Terminal)	
New Orleans	United States	Port of New Orleans (New Orleans Terminal)	
New York	United States	Port of New York and New Jersey (Port Newark Container Terminal)	
Rio de Janeiro	Brazil	Port of Rio de Janeiro (Multi-Rio Container Terminal)	
Rotterdam	Netherlands	Port of Rotterdam (Europahaven Container Terminal)	
San-Pédro	Ivory Coast	Port Autonome de San Pedro (San Pedro Container Terminal)	
Santos	Brazil	Port of Santos (BTP Container Terminal)	
Seattle	United States	Port of Seattle (TTI Seattle)	
Sines	Portugal	Port of Sines (Sines Container Terminal)	Joint venture between PSA and TiL
Singapore	Singapore	Port of Singapore (MSC PSA Asia Terminal)	Joint venture between TiL and PSA
Trieste	Italy	Port of Trieste (Trieste Marine Terminal)	80%
Umm Qasr	Iraq	Umm Qasr Port (Basra Multipurpose Terminal)	
Valencia	Spain	Port of Valencia (MSC Terminal Valencia)	

== Fleet ==
Container ship classes of MSC
Ship class	Built	Capacity (TEU)	Ships in class	Notes
MSC Daniela-class	2008–2010	13,798	8	
MSC Danit-class	2009–2012	13,050–14,036	23	9 ships under long-term charter from Claus-Peter Offen
MSC Beryl-class	2010–2012	12,991	9	Long-term charter from Niki Shipping
MSC Alicante-class	2011–2012	5,574	6	Long-term charter from Claus-Peter Offen
MSC Benedetta-class	2011–2012	13,100	8	
MSC Olympic-class	2014–2015	19,224	6	MSC Oscar was the world's largest container ship when it was delivered in December 2014.
MSC London-class	2014–2016	16,652	6	
MSC Lily-class	2015	8,800	12	Long-term charter from China International Marine.
MSC Pegasus-class	2016–2017	19,224–19,462	14	
MSC Josseline-class	2019	14,336	5	
MSC Orion-class	2019	14,952	4	Long-term charter from Zodiac Maritime
MSC Gülsün-class	2019–2021	23,656–23,756	16	MSC Gülsün was the world's largest container ship when it was delivered in July 2019.
MSC Bianca-class	2019–2022	12.200	7	Long-term charter from Seaspan Corporation.
MSC Fatma-class	2022–2023	15,300	11	
MSC Jiani-class	2023–2024	1.800	10	
MSC Mara-class	2023–2024	15,000	6	Long-term charter from Zodiac Maritime and Cido Shipping.
MSC Berangere-class	2023–2024	15,500	4	
MSC Ilenia-class	2023–2024	16,000	9	Long-term charter from Seaspan Corporation.
MSC Chiyo-class	2023–2024	16,616	9	Long-term charter from Shin Doun Kisen.
MSC Tessa-class	2023–2024	24,116	8	MSC Tessa was the world's largest container ship when it was delivered in March 2023.
MSC Irina-class	2023–2024	24,232	6	MSC Irina was the world's largest container ship when it was delivered in March 2023 a few days after the former record holder MSC Tessa.
MSC Maputo-class	2024–2025	7,700	6	To be built by Hyundai Heavy Industries.
MSC Ivory Coast-class	2024–2025	8,100	10	To be built by New Times Shipbuilding.
TBD	2024–2025	11,400	10	To be built by New Times Shipbuilding.
TBD	2024–2025	16,000	6	To be built by Dalian Shipbuilding Industry Co.
TBD	2024–2025	16,000	12	To be built by Yangzijiang Shipbuilding.
TBD	2025	8,000	14	To be built by New Times Shipbuilding.
TBD	2025	7,900	6	To be built by Hyundai Heavy Industries.
TBD	2025–2026	11,400	10	To be built by Zhoushan Changhong International Shipyard.
TBD	2025–2026	11,500	10	To be built by Zhoushan Changhong International Shipyard.
TBD	2025–2026	21,000	10	To be built by Jiangsu New Hantong Ship Heavy Industry.
TBD	2026–2027	10,300	10	To be built by Zhoushan Changhong International Shipyard.
TBD	2027–2028	11,500	16	To be built by Penglai Zhongbai Jinglu Ship Industry.
TBD	2027–2028	12,000	12	To be built by Jiangsu Rongsheng Heavy Industries.
TBD	2027–2028	19,000	12	To be built by Zhoushan Changhong International Shipyard.
TBD	2027–2028	19,000	6	To be built by Shanghai Waigaoqiao Shipbuilding.
TBD	2027–2028	21,000	10	To be built by Hengli Heavy Industry.
TBD	2027–2028	22,000	6	To be built by China Merchants Heavy Industries.
TBD	2028	21,000	6	To be built by China Merchants Heavy Industries.
TBD	2028–2029	21,700	8	To be built by Zhoushan Changhong International Shipyard.
TBD	2028–2029	22,000	6	To be built by Hengli Heavy Industry.
TBD	2028–2030	24,000	10	To be built by Hengli Heavy Industry.
TBD	2029	11,400	10	To be built by Zhoushan Changhong International Shipyard.
TBD	2029	20,000	20	To be built by Hengli Heavy Industry.

Other ships:

- MSC Beatrice
- MSC Bruxelles
- MSC Carmen
- MSC Carouge
- MSC Chicago
- MSC Cordoba
- MSC Danit
- MSC Geneva
- MSC Gülsün
- MSC Leigh
- MSC Madeleine
- MSC Napoli
- MSC Nuria
- MSC Oscar
- MSC Pamela
- MSC Rosaria
- MSC Sindy
- MSC Zoe

== Aircraft ==
MSC Air Cargo fleet
Aircraft	In service	Orders	Notes
Boeing 777F	7	5	Fourth and fifth aircraft delivered in early 2024.

== 2M Alliance: Maersk SeaLand/MSC ==
2M Alliance was a Maersk SeaLand and MSC vessel-sharing agreement (VSA) launched in 2015 to ensure competitive and cost-efficient operations on the Asia-Europe, trans-Pacific and trans-Atlantic trades. The arrangement included a series of slot exchanges and slot purchases on east–west routes, also involved Maersk Line and MSC taking over a number of charters and operations of vessels chartered to HMM. The 2M Alliance included 185 vessels with an estimated capacity of 2.1 million TEU, deployed on 21 strings. The 2M arrangement had a minimum term of 10 years with a 2-year notice period of termination. On 25 January 2023, CEO Vincent Clerc of A. P. Moller – Maersk and CEO Soren Toft of MSC announced in a joint press statement that the two shipping lines would terminate the 2M Alliance in January 2025.

== Incidents ==
=== MSC Carla ===
On 24 November 1997, the container ship MSC Carla encountered heavy weather and broke apart northeast of Azores in the North Atlantic Ocean, when on route to Boston, United States, from Le Havre, France. The 34 crew members were air-lifted by helicopter to safety. The fore part sank over a period of five days. The stern was towed to Spain where it was scrapped. In 1984, the previous owners of MSC Carla (her name was Nihon at that time) lengthened the ship by 15 metres (49 ft 3 in). This was accomplished by cutting the vessel in two and welding in a lengthening module. The structural failure was at the forward end of the new mid-body. The design and installation of the new structure by the shipyard was found to have been faulty.

=== MSC Napoli ===
On 18 January 2007, the container ship MSC Napoli was abandoned in the English Channel due to European storm Kyrill after severe gale-force winds and huge waves caused serious damage to MSC Napoli's hull, including a crack in one side and a flooded engine room. All 26 crew were picked up from their lifeboat by Sea King helicopters of the Royal Navy's Fleet Air Arm and taken to Royal Naval Air Station Culdrose in Cornwall. On 19 January 2007, the ship was taken under tow but because of the ship's deteriorating condition it was decided to beach the ship at Branscombe. On 9 July 2007 the MSC Napoli was refloated, but was immediately re-beached as a crack measuring 3 meters (9.8 ft) was found in the vessel's hull, running down both sides and through the keel. The decision was made to break the ship up near Branscombe beach.

=== MSC Nikita ===
On 29 August 2009, the container ship MSC Nikita was involved in a collision with Nirint Pride off the Port of Rotterdam and was breached in the engine room. She was towed to Rotterdam for emergency repairs and subsequently declared a total loss. There were no casualties.

=== MSC Chitra ===
On 7 August 2010, the container ship MSC Chitra was involved in a collision with the bulk carrier Khalijia II while leaving Jawaharlal Nehru Port east of Mumbai in Navi Mumbai's Raigad district, India. Khalijia II had ripped into MSC Chitra's port side, creating three major dents in its hull and the engine room gradually flooded. After collision the MSC Chitra listed heavily and was grounded 8 km (5.0 mi) outside of the port. The captain and 32 crew members were evacuated. On 17 April 2011, after the ship was declared a total loss, MSC Chitra was scuttled by Titan Maritime approximately 385 miles (620 km) off the coast of Mumbai.

=== MSC Zoe ===
On 1 January 2019, whilst on a voyage from Portugal to Bremerhaven carrying more than 8,000 containers, MSC Zoe encountered severe weather causing her to roll violently. 345 containers went overboard into the North Sea near the Wadden islands off the Dutch coast. Of these, 297 containers were lost north of the Dutch island Ameland, and the remaining 48 containers were found some hours later north of the German island Borkum.

=== MSC Gayane ===
A shipment of cocaine was captured in the 2019 Philadelphia Packer Marine Terminal cocaine seizure that totalled 20 tons, with a street value of US$1.3 billion. That ship, MSC Gayane, was seized by U.S. Customs and Border Protection due to the scale of the smuggling. The company denied that it intentionally facilitated this, and stated that the wrongdoing was carried out by a small number of employees who had been corrupted or coerced by drug cartels. US and European authorities concluded that the Balkan gangs responsible control more than half of the cocaine flowing into Europe, and had infiltrated MSC's crews over a decade of effort.

=== MSC Messina ===
On 24 June 2021, the container ship MSC Messina caught fire in the midway of the Indian Ocean halfway between Sri Lanka and Malacca Strait. The fire broke in the engine room of the ship, at 480 nautical miles (890 km; 550 mi) away from the Great Basses Reef Lighthouse, Kirinda.

=== MSC Danit ===
On 16 October 2021, the container ship MSC Danit was boarded in the Port of Long Beach by the United States Coast Guard and National Transportation Safety Board marine casualty investigators. They were investigating an undersea pipeline that appeared to have been damaged by a ship's anchor and recently spilled oil onto the beaches of Orange County. MSC and ship owner, Dordellas Finance Corporation, and others were designated as parties of interest in the investigation.

=== MSC Palatium III ===
On 15 December 2023, during the Gaza war, MSC Palatium III was damaged in a missile attack by Houthi movement insurgents in Yemen as she transited the Red Sea. She turned around and exited the area. In a statement the next day, MSC said that the ship had been taken out of service, there were no injuries to the crew, and that the company would cease routing vessels through the Red Sea due to the danger of further Houthi attacks. MSC Palatium III had been sailing under the Liberian flag and was not Israeli-owned, so it was not clear why she was attacked, but a U.S. intelligence analyst told the Associated Press that the ship may have been deliberately targeted because MSC had cooperated with the Israeli government.

=== MSC Aries ===
On 13 April 2024 in the Gulf of Oman, off the Emirati port city of Fujairah, the Iranian Revolutionary Guard Corps Navy boarded and seized container ship MSC Aries, claiming she was "violating maritime laws". She was flying the ensign of Portugal. MSC Aries is leased by MSC from Gortal Shipping Inc., an affiliate of Zodiac Maritime (ZM). The 25 crew aboard includes 17 Indian nationals, Filipinos, Pakistanis, a Russian and an Estonian. Iran has similarly attacked vessels and seized ships amidst persistent political issues since 2019. On 3 May 2024, Iranian Foreign Minister Hossein Amirabdollahian announced that captain and crew had been released, while the vessel remained held by Iran.

=== MSC Vera Cruz ===
On 24 April 2024, the Madeira-flagged cargo ship MSC Vera Cruz, while about 72 nautical miles (133 km; 83 mi) southeast of Djibouti, was unsuccessfully fired upon, in tandem with U.S.-flagged container ship Maersk Yorktown, by Iranian-backed Houthi militants, who claimed responsibility.

=== MSC Gina and MSC Diego ===
In May 2024, the two ships MSC Gina and MSC Diego were attacked by Houthi rebels in the Red Sea. There was little damage done. The former also had a similar incident in the previous month.

=== MSC Tavvishi ===
In June 2024, Houthi rebels fired missiles at MSC Tavvishi and a couple of other ships, as they were sailing on the Red Sea.

=== MSC Baltic III ===
On 15 February 2025, MSC Baltic III ran aground close to the Lark Harbour shoreline along the west coast of Newfoundland after losing power in stormy weather. The 22 crew members were airlifted by Canadian Armed Forces members from 103 Search and Rescue Squadron. On 25 February the Canadian Coast Guard assessment of the hull has confirmed significant breaches and there was evidence that seawater is beginning to enter the ship. As of September 10, 2026, over 40% of the wreck's tonnage has been removed.

=== MSC Levante F ===
On 1 March 2025, while in port at Odessa, Ukraine, MSC Levante F was targeted by two Russian Iskander-M missiles. The missiles missed their target and struck the bulk carrier Super Sarkas that was loading 21,000 tonnes of corn and soya. The container ship sustained minor damage, such as broken portholes, mainly from the impact of the shock wave, and left the port safely.

=== MSC Elsa 3 ===
On 24 May 2025, Liberian-flagged container ship MSC Elsa 3 capsized off the Kerala coast in India. The vessel was carrying 640 containers, including 13 with hazardous materials such as calcium carbide, and over 450 metric tonnes of marine fuel. All crew members were rescued by the Indian Navy and Coast Guard.

=== MSC Francesca and Epaminondas ===
On April 22, 2026, two cargo ships, MSC Francesca (IMO: 9401116) and Epaminondas (IMO 9153862) were seized by the Islamic Revolutionary Guard Corps (IRGC) while crossing the Strait of Hormuz. Eight Epaminondas crew members were released in June 2026. MSC Francesca is Panama-flagged and operated by MSC. Epaminondas is Liberia-flagged and operated by Greek shipper Techomar Group chartered by MSC.

=== MSC Victorine ===
On 25 October 2026, Mein Schiff 3 collided with MSC Victorine, a container ship, while leaving the German port of Bremerhaven. At the time, Bremerhaven was in stormy conditions. The collision damaged some of the ship's lifeboats and Mein Schiff 3 returned to port. So far, no injuries have been reported.

== See also ==
- List of largest container shipping companies
