= MSC Chicago =

Container ship

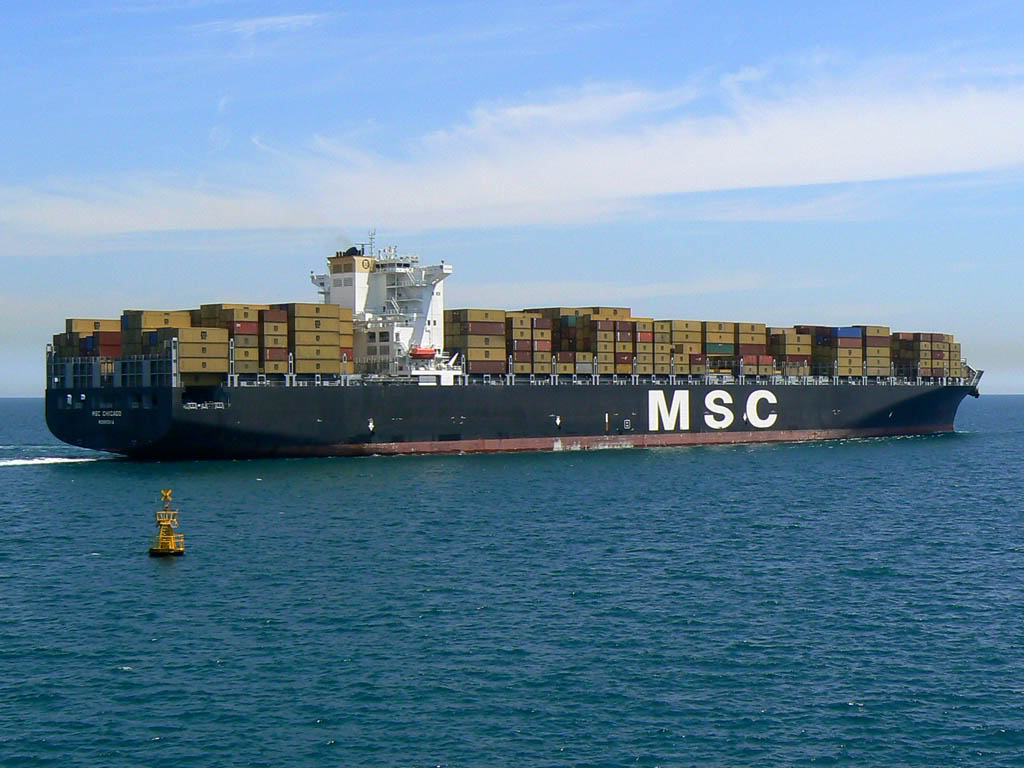
- MSC Chicago leaving from Valencia port

History
- Name: MSC Chicago
- Owner: Santa Linea Shipping Corp
- Operator: Reederei Claus-Peter Offen GmbH & Co
- Port of registry: Monrovia, Liberia, Liberia
- Builder: Samsung Heavy Industries
- Yard number: 1510
- Completed: November 2005
- Identification: IMO number: 9290555; Call Sign: A8H52; MMSI number: 636012763; Official No: HK-1882
- Status: Operational

General characteristics
- Length: 336.7m
- Beam: 321m
- Draught: 15m
- Depth: 27.2m
- Installed power: 68,520kW(93,159hp)
- Propulsion: 1 oil engine
- Speed: 25.2kt

MSC Chicago is one of the largest container ships and is owned by Santa Linea Shipping Corp. The vessel is operated through a partnership with the Mediterranean Shipping Company.

== Hull and Engine ==
MSC Chicago was built by Samsung Heavy Industries in yard 1510 and was completed in November 2005. The port of registry for the ship is in Monrovia, Liberia. The ship is 336.7m in length and 321m across the beam. The MSC Chicago has a depth of 27.2 m, and a draught of 15m.

The vessel is powered by a Man B&W 12K98MC-C engine, capable of producing 68,520 kW(93,159 hp) driving 1 propeller. This ship's maximum speed is 25kt.
