= Beryl-class container ship =

Container ship class

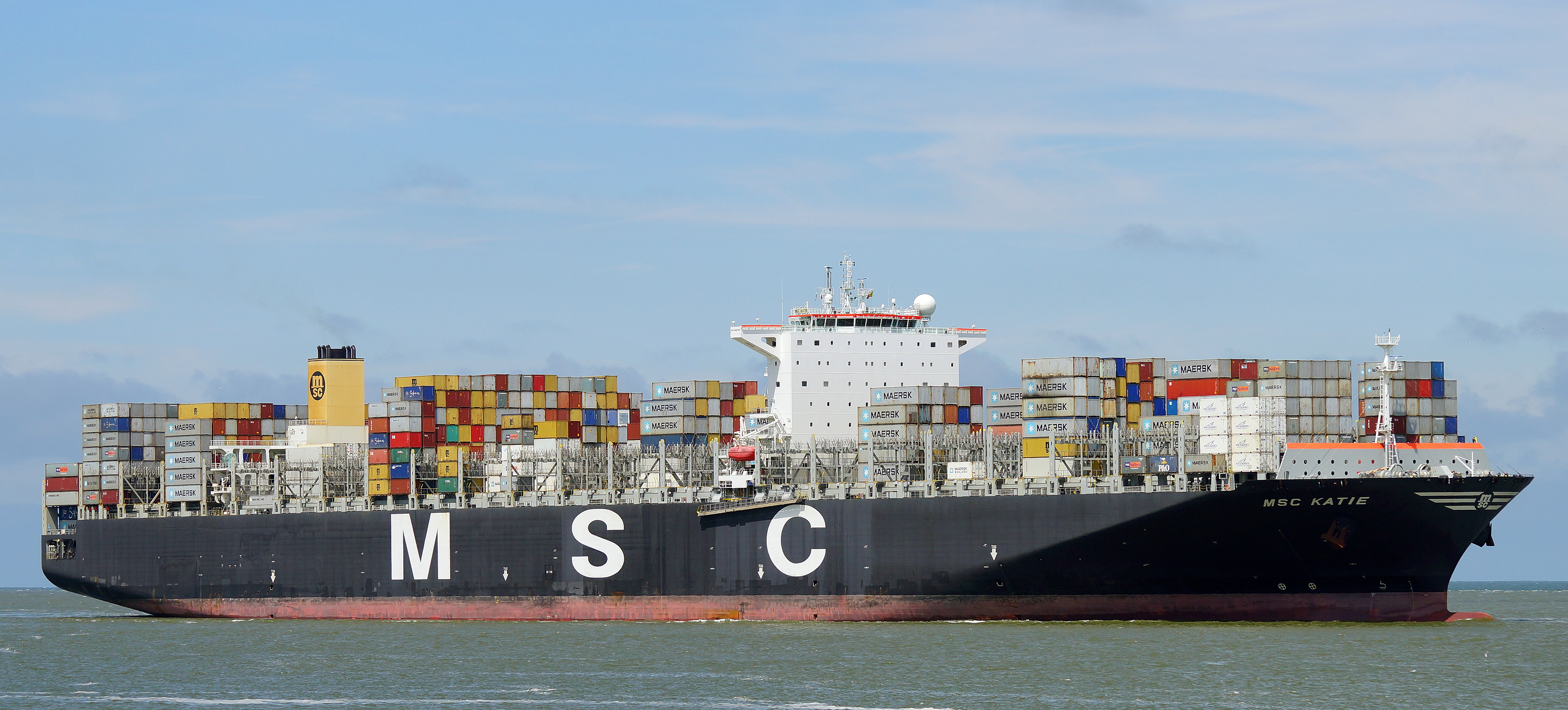
- MSC Katie in the port of Rotterdam

Class overview
- Builders: STX Offshore & Shipbuilding
- Operators: Mediterranean Shipping Company
- In service: 2010–present
- Planned: 9
- Completed: 7
- Canceled: 2
- Active: 7

General characteristics
- Type: Container ship
- Tonnage: 140,096 GT
- Length: 365.8 m (1,200 ft 2 in)
- Beam: 48.4 m (158 ft 10 in)
- Draught: 16.5 m (54 ft 2 in)
- Capacity: 12,991 TEU

The Beryl class is a series of 7 container ships built for Niki Shipping and operated by Mediterranean Shipping Company. The ships were built by STX Offshore & Shipbuilding in South Korea and have a maximum theoretical capacity of around 12,991 twenty-foot equivalent units (TEU). The initial order was for a total of 9 ships, but only 7 were actually built.

== List of ships ==
Ship	Yard number	IMO number	Delivery	Status	ref
MSC Beryl	S-3011	9467392	30 Sep 2010	In service	
MSC Lauren	S-3012	9467407	10 Jan 2011	In service	
MSC Laurence	S-3015	9467419	4 May 2011	In service	
MSC Maria Saveria	S-3016	9467421	26 Oct 2011	In service	
MSC Flavia	S-3018	9467433	13 Feb 2012	In service	
MSC Katrina	S-3021	9467445	16 May 2012	In service	
MSC Katie	S-3022	9467457	12 Nov 2012	In service	
	S-3023	9467469		Canceled	
	S-3024	9467471		Canceled	
