= MSC Madeleine =

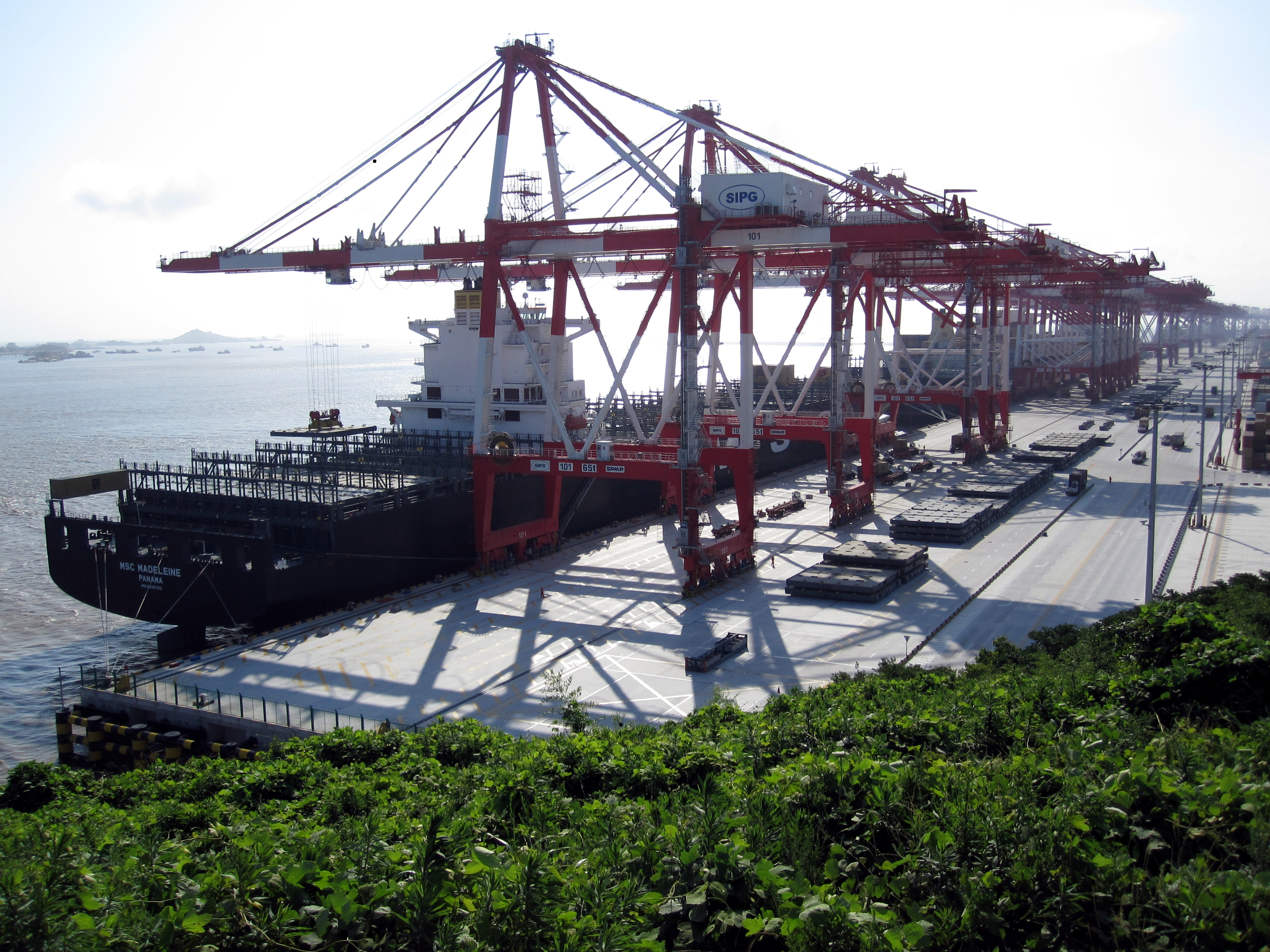
- MSC Madeleine at Yangshan Port

History
- Name: MSC Madeleine
- Operator: MSC Ship Management
- Launched: 10 March 2006
- Status: In service
- Notes: Call Sign: 3EFR7; IMO number: 9305702; MMSI number: 353728000

General characteristics
- Type: Container ship
- Tonnage: 107,551 GT; 107,200 DWT
- Length: 348.50 m (1,143.4 ft)
- Beam: 42.80 m (140.4 ft)
- Draft: 14.50 m (47.6 ft)
- Installed power: MAN B&W 12K98MC-C
- Propulsion: Single shaft; fixed pitch propeller
- Speed: 23.7 knots (43.9 km/h; 27.3 mph) (maximum); 23.1 knots (42.8 km/h; 26.6 mph) (service)
- Capacity: 9,113 TEU
- Crew: 25

MSC Madeleine is a container ship. It was built in 2006 at Guangzhou Shipyard in China, and is operated by Mediterranean Shipping Company.

== Design ==
MSC Madeleine is 348.50 m (1,143.4 ft) long, with a 42.80 m (140.4 ft)-long beam. Its draft is 14.50 m (47.6 ft) when the ship is fully loaded. The maximum cargo capacity is 9,113 TEU and the ship's gross tonnage is 107,551.
