= MSC Josseline-class container ship =

Container ship class

Class overview
- Builders: Hyundai Heavy Industries
- Operators: Mediterranean Shipping Company
- In service: 2019–present
- Planned: 5
- Completed: 5
- Active: 5

General characteristics
- Type: Container ship
- Tonnage: 140,976 GT
- Length: 365.9 m (1,200 ft 6 in)
- Beam: 48.2 m (158 ft 2 in)
- Draught: 16 m (52 ft 6 in)
- Capacity: 14,336 TEU

The Josseline class is a series of 5 container ships built for Zodiac Maritime. and were charted to Mediterranean Shipping Company (MSC). The ships were built by Hyundai Heavy Industries in South Korea. The ships have a maximum theoretical capacity of 14,336 twenty-foot equivalent units (TEU).

== List of ships ==
Ship	Yard number	IMO number	Delivery	Status	ref
MSC Josseline	3024	9842061	30 May 2019	In service	
MSC Jewel	3025	9842073	13 Jun 2019	In service	
MSC Faith	3026	9842085	11 Jul 2019	In service	
MSC Aliya	3027	9842097	14 Aug 2019	In service	
MSC Kanoko	3028	9842102	11 Nov 2019	In service	
