= MSC Pamela =

- MSC Pamela at the Port of Felixstowe, England, on 15 August 2005

History
- Name: MSC Pamela
- Owner: Compania Naviera Pamela S.A.
- Operator: Mediterranean Shipping Company
- Port of registry: Panama
- Builder: Samsung Heavy Industries, Geoje, South Korea
- Yard number: 1508
- Laid down: 7 February 2005
- Launched: 20 April 2005
- Completed: 11 July 2005
- In service: 2005–Present
- Identification: IMO number: 9290531; Call sign: 3EBT6; MMSI number: 371228000
- Status: In service

General characteristics
- Type: Container ship
- Tonnage: 107,849 GT; 61,479 NT; 117,063 DWT
- Length: 336.64 m (1,104 ft 6 in)
- Beam: 45.60 m (149 ft 7 in)
- Draft: 15.50 m (50 ft 10 in)
- Depth: 27.20 m (89 ft 3 in)
- Installed power: MAN-HSD 12K98MC-C (68,520 kW)
- Propulsion: Single shaft, fixed pitch propeller; Bow thruster (3,000 kW)
- Speed: 25 knots (46 km/h; 29 mph)
- Capacity: 9,200 TEU

MSC Pamela was built by Samsung Heavy Industries and launched in 2005. The vessel's engine, also built by Samsung Heavy Industries, consumes 248 tonnes of heavy fuel oil per day.

The vessel measures 336.6m in length, a draft of 15m, with a gross tonnage of 107,200 and with a breadth of 45.6m (150ft); is capable of a maximum speed of 25.2 knots. She sails under the Panamanian flag for the Mediterranean Shipping Company.

At its launch, MSC Pamela broke the world records for the number of containers that could be carried on a single vessel. As a post-Panamax vessel, and therefore unable to pass through the Panama Canal, she operates between the major ports of Europe and the Far East.
