= Maritime Drug Law Enforcement Act =

1986 United States law

- Long title: An Act implemented and routinely used by the United States Coast Guard allowing them to board foreign ships on the high seas under allegations of drug trafficking.
- Acronyms (colloquial): MDLEA
- Nicknames: Maritime Drug Law Enforcement Act of 1986
- Enacted by: the 99th United States Congress
- Effective: 1986

Citations
- Public law: 705

The Maritime Drug Law Enforcement Act (MDLEA), implemented in 1986 by the United States, is a piece of legislation combatting the illegal drug trade. The MDLEA establishes that it is illegal for anyone on board a vessel belonging to the United States or within their jurisdiction to deliberately produce or disseminate psychotropic substances. The Act is notable for its extraterritorial jurisdiction and its lack of nexus requirement. The Act provides that the United States jurisdiction reaches any vessel "registered in a foreign nation where the flag nation has consented or waived objection to the enforcement of the United States law by the United States." In recent years the MDLEA has been met with controversy as it permits the U.S. Coast Guard the authority to reach and imprison drug traffickers who are operating over international waters and foreign citizens who are not located on board the watercraft but operating overseas or as a conspirator.

== History ==
The United Nations Convention against Illicit Traffic in Narcotic Drugs and Psychotropic Substances held in 1988 established how drug trafficking should be criminalised presented comprehensive measures of international cooperation arguing that drug traffickers and any individuals involved in the delivery and distribution of drugs be charged and extradited. The United States, in an effort to control these drug-related crimes, implemented a series of acts which focus on the reduction of both supply and demand. Such acts have been accomplished via the creation of bilateral maritime agreements, allowing the United States to enforce U.S. law against vessels of foreign registry.

The predecessor to MDLEA, although intended to stop narcotic importation, failed in its lack of jurisdiction. In some cases it allowed individuals to escape liability when found on the high seas with drugs by arguing that evidence of conspiracy could not be found. Additionally, in other cases individuals were able to escape liability by remaining in international waters and transferring drugs into small speed boats that were not as easy to catch. In 1986 the United States found it imperative to implement this legislation in an effort to overcome the problems of law enforcement and jurisdiction over international waters. Enacted within a larger body of legislation as part of the 1986 Anti-Drug Abuse, the Act received bipartisan support.

== Amendments ==
Since its enactment in 1986, the Act has been amended a number of times. The Act was first revised in 1996 to increase U.S. jurisdiction. A small provision was added to clarify jurisdiction and extraterritoriality.

The Act was further amended on October 3, 2008, to include what is now item 70508. The amendment included that the use of submersible and semi-submersible vessels without nationality be within U.S. jurisdiction. The amendment defined a 'semi-submersible' vessel as any kind of water vessel that is "capable of operating with most of its hull and bulk under the surface of the water" no matter whether the watercraft be crewed or uncrewed. The amendment defined a 'submersible' vessel as a watercraft able to operate "completely below the surface of the water", disregarding whether the vessel be crewed or uncrewed. In addition to these definitions the amendment stated that any person in violation of the act will be liable to a civil penalty of up to $1,000,000 paid to the United States.

The Act was amended for a third time on February 8, 2016, to include some minor changes surrounding the phrasing of different sections of the legislation. These amendments included striking "watch program" in the heading of section 70122 and replacing it with "Watch Program" and inserting a period at the end of item 70508. Additionally, former item of 7053 was struck out and replaced with new item 7053 detailing "Manufacture, distribution, or possession of controlled substances on vessels".

== Legislation Background and Cases ==
=== United States v. Aragon ===
This case concerned a number of defendants who on April 14, 2015, were found attempting to smuggle 550 kilograms of cocaine into the United States from Colombia and Ecuador. Daniel German Sanchez Alarcon, a Colombian drug trafficker, was one of the eight individuals responsible for this crime. Although not being present at the scene of the crime or being located within the United States itself during the time of the crime, Alarcon ended up being arrested and held within the United States prison. On July 5, 2017, Defendant Sanchez's motion to dismiss charges under the MDLEA was denied by the Southern District of New York for a lack of jurisdiction. The MDLEA which states that "[w]hile on board a covered vessel, an individual may not knowingly or intentionally . . . manufacture or distribute, or possess with intent to manufacture or distribute, a controlled substance". However, Sanchez proposed that, although within the MDLEA conspirators can be prosecuted, that conspiracy provisions only reach individuals operating within the United States or on board the vessel.

=== United States v. Suerte ===
This case, settled in 2002, concerned Defendant Nestor Suerte, a Philippine citizen residing in Colombia who captained a Malta registered freight ship property of an infamous Venezuelan/Colombian drug trafficking ring. Suerte had coordinated the smuggling of 4900 kilograms of cocaine from Venezuela to be distributed in Europe. Suerte argued that the Due Process Clause of the Fifth Amendment of the US Constitution requires a nexus between the charged individual and the United States, being connected either by being on the smuggling vessel, on international waters, in the United States or attempting to smuggle drugs into the United States. Suerte, who has never set foot in the United States, is not a United States citizen, was not on the vessel when it was seized, and was attempting to smuggle drugs into Europe, was charged even though he remained in Colombia the whole time. He was charged and convicted by the United States and imprisoned within the United States. Suerte's case is notable for analysing the constitutionality of the MDLEA, the MDLEA's relationship with international law and its jurisdictional and extraterritorial scope.

=== United States v. Carvajal ===
The case concerning the two defendants Luis Alberto Munoz Miranda and Francisco Jose Valderrama Carvajal is notable as it is one of few cases involving prosecutions where a vessel was seized in a foreign territorial waters and where the individuals involved operated exclusively within a foreign country without any nexus relationship to the United States. The two defendants, both Colombian residents working for an international drug trafficking organisation, had organised two vessels to transport five kilograms of cocaine from Colombia to a location in the waters bordering Honduras. The two vessels used to transfer the cocaine were both 'stateless vessels', unregistered vessels without any national claim, one of which was captured by the Colombian Navy whilst still in Colombian waters. The second vessel was seized by Colombian officials in Colombian waters after running aground on a Colombian owned island. Relying on two former cases to support its reasoning, the D.C. court upheld that individual conspirators, regardless of whether they are operating "on board" a vessel or in a foreign country can be prosecuted under the MDLEA. This decision was used to aid Congress's intent of closing any jurisdictional loopholes within cases concerning the MDLEA.

After the prosecution, the D.C. District Court's analysis of the Carvajal case and its conclusions were scrutinised for four reasons. Firstly, in order to determine Congress's jurisdiction the D.C. court applied conspiracy law. However, it is undecided by the United States courts of appeals whether the use of conspiracy law to determine jurisdiction is applicable for courts. Secondly, the court's analysis did not employ a statutory interpretation when analysing the breadth of the MDLEA.^{[1]} The court argued that the conspiracy provision should include actions that may or may not occur on board any subject vessel. However, in this assertion the D.C. court overlooks a number of factors. Historically the United States has only ever prosecuted individuals on the high seas when they were able to prove active conspiracy on board. Additionally, there is no statutory legislation that determines whether such conspiracy clauses extend to individuals operating on land and not on a vessel on the high seas. Thirdly, the Court's analysis was partly based on the findings of separate cases that were factually distinguishable. The Court referred to the cases of United States v. Medjuck and United States v. Salcedo-Ibarra, both of which had a direct nexus to the United States and therefore fell under the jurisdictional scope of the US not requiring statutory interpretation of conspiracy provisions. Finally, the Court did not name any previous authority showing Congress's proposed application of the MDLEA extending to foreign individuals within a foreign nation. Although Congress intended for the far-reaching use of the MDLEA this does not directly translate to a far-reaching and widely expansive interpretation of its legislation. The Carvajal case thus became notable for the court's controversial analysis due to their lack of consideration when resolving issues surrounding the application of conspiracy clauses.

== Controversy ==
Since its enactment in 1986, the MDLEA has been scrutinised for its statutory language making it difficult to determine whether Congress has constitutional authority to extend prosecutions to foreign nationals operating on land in a foreign nation. Through the MDLEA, the Constitution allows Congress the capacity to prosecute drug trafficking individuals operating on the high seas. In executing this provision United States Congress intended the legislation to be expansive spanning to acts carried out outside the United States' jurisdiction and territorial boundaries. However, the United States courts of appeals are divided on whether a nexus to the United States is necessary when utilising the MDLEA extraterritorially. This nexus requirement would link the defendant to the United States by either: residing in the United States, being a United States citizen, operating within United States territorial waters or on the high seas or conspiring to traffic drugs to or via the United States. The courts of appeals are undecided on whether applying the MDLEA to a defendant that has no connection to the United States and who was seized on international or foreign waters is unfair and inconsistent with the normal judicial system. If minimum contracts are necessary for a court to assert personal jurisdiction over a foreign defendant, should a similar concept be utilised when exercising United States jurisdiction over defendants who are neither citizens or residents of the United States. By extending the statute to reach these foreign conspirators, the United States is depriving offenders the opportunity of due process, a suitable forum, and correct notice. This subsequently excludes such offenders from proper practices of the United States judicial system.

Historically, cases regarding the MDLEA have lacked consistency in determining whether a nexus is required for the United States to apply extraterritorial jurisdiction. These trends have led to the argument that applying the MDLEA to extend to foreign citizens operating as conspirators overseas is unconstitutional. By extending the statute to reach these foreign conspirators, the United States is depriving offenders the opportunity of due process, a suitable forum, and correct notice, and subsequently excludes such offenders from proper judicial practices. Because of these inconsistencies, recommendations have been put forward to courts and legislators that the statutory language of the MDLEA should be amended. These amendments would ensure individuals can only be prosecuted when 'on board' a vessel. If such amendments do not take place, courts are advised to interpret the jurisdiction scope of the MDLEA as limited by the language of 'on board' a vessel.
