= MSC Bruxelles =

Container ship registered in Monrovia, Liberia

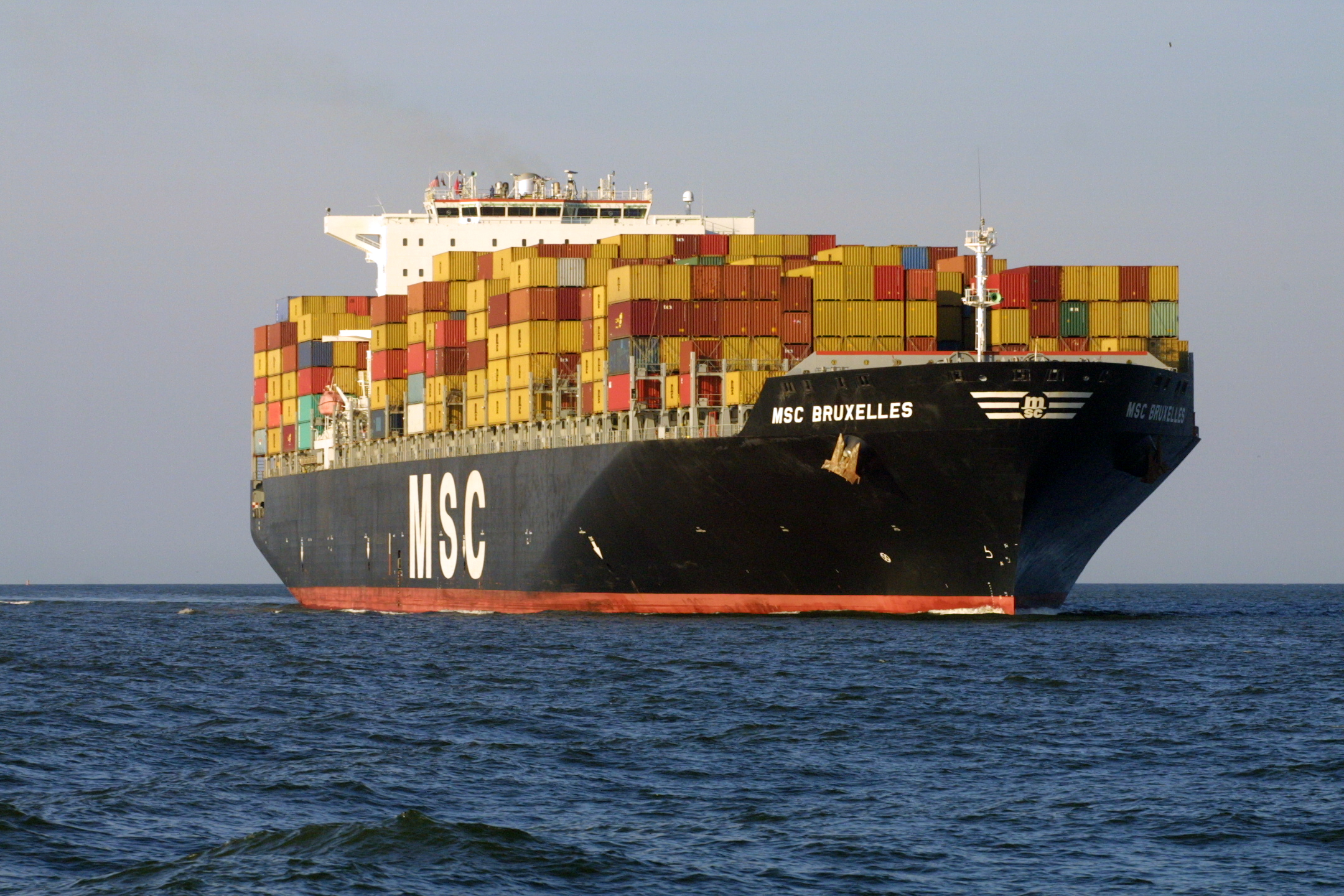
- MSC Bruxelles in Virginia

History
- Name: MSC Bruxelles
- Owner: Santa Loretta Shipping Corp
- Operator: Redeerei Claus-Peter Offen GmbH & Co. KG
- Port of registry: Monrovia, Liberia
- Builder: Samsung Heavy Industries
- Yard number: 1511
- Launched: 10 September 2005
- Completed: November 2005
- Identification: IMO number: 9290567; Call Sign: A8HS3; MMSI number: 636012764; Official No: 12764
- Status: In service

General characteristics
- Tonnage: 107,849 GT; 110,860 DWT
- Length: 337m
- Beam: 46m
- Draft: 15m
- Depth: 27m
- Installed power: 68,520kW(93,159hp)
- Propulsion: 1 oil engine

MSC Bruxelles is one of the largest container ships in the world. She has a maximum capacity of 9,200 TEU . The ship is owned by Santa Loretta Shipping Corp.

== Hull and engine ==
MSC Bruxelles was built by Samsung Heavy Industries in yard 1511 and was finished in November 2005. This dry cargo container ship is operated by Redeerei Claus-Peter Offen GmbH & Co. KG and the Port of Registry is Monrovia, Liberia. MSC Bruxelles has a length of 337m, a beam of 46m, a draught of 15m, and a depth of 27m.

MSC Bruxelles is powered by a MAN-B&W 12K98MC-C, 2 stroke 12 cylinder engine, capable of producing 68,520 kW, or 93,159 hp driving one fixed pitch propeller.
