= Mangalia shipyard =

Shipyard in Mangalia, Romania

Coordinates: 43.799°N 28.567°E

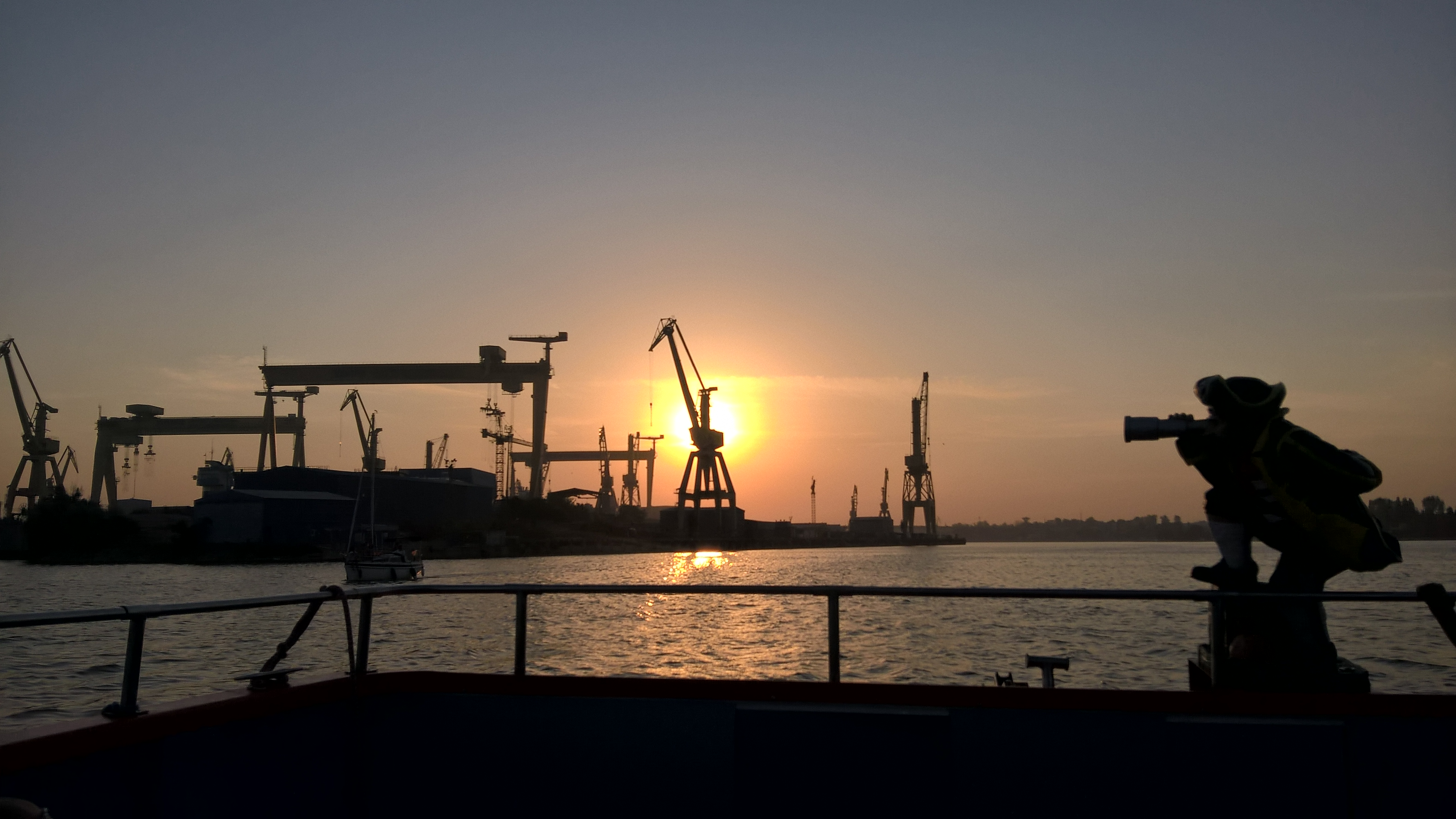
- View of the shipyard, 2017
- Industry: Ship building, ship conversion and repair
- Founded: 1976
- Headquarters: Mangalia, Romania
- Products: Military ships, large merchant vessels and offshore structures
- Revenue: ▲57.27 mln EUR (2019)
- Net income: ▲ -31.99 mln EUR (2019)
- Number of employees: 1,500 (2022)

Shipyards of Romania

Mangalia shipyard is a large shipyard located 45 km (28 mi) south of the Port of Constanța, in Mangalia, Romania.

== History ==
=== Daewoo Heavy Industries era ===
In 1997 Daewoo-Mangalia Heavy Industries or DMHI was formed as a joint venture between South Korean company Daewoo Shipbuilding & Marine Engineering and the 2 Mai Shipyard in Mangalia. Since it was founded the company built over 127 new ships and repaired around 300 ships.

=== Damen era ===
In 2017, Damen Group acquired Daewoo's shares, and from 2018 it took control of the shipyard. Mangalia is the largest of Damen's shipyards. The ownership of the shipyard is shared between Damen and the Romanian Government, with Damen being responsible for its operations.

=== Rheinmetall-MSC era ===
In 2026, the shipyard declared bankruptcy and was planned to be sold for investments. After Rheinmetall was selected for the production of two offshore patrol vessels and two diving support vessels through the Security Action for Europe program in a €5.7 billion package, the company was required to purchase the shipyard for local production of the ships.

In October 2026, the shipyard was jointly acquired by Rheinmetall and the Mediterranean Shipping Company for €138 million. Rheinmetall plans to conduct military shipbuilding through Rheinmetall Naval Systems, while MSC will conduct civil shipbuilding.

== Operations ==
The shipyard is spread over an area of 980,000 m^{2} (10,500,000 sq ft), has three dry docks with a total length of 982 m (3,222 ft) and 1.6 km (0.99 mi) of berths. In 2002 the company delivered two tankers of 42,500 DWT to the Norwegian company Kleven Floro used for the transportation of orange juice. One of the main customers of the shipyard is the German company Hamburg Süd which ordered six container ships of around 6,000 TEU each, and seven ships of 7,100 TEU each as well as four tugboats. The company also signed in 2005 an agreement with Mediterranean Shipping Company, NSB Niederelbe, Gebab and Conti Reederei companies for the construction of 12 container ships of around 5,000 TEU each that will be delivered in stages until 2011 at a total cost of US$1.1 billion.

== Goliath Crane ==
In 2008 the shipyard bought the largest gantry crane in North America, the Goliath Crane, formerly located in Quincy, Massachusetts, from the General Dynamics company. Built in 1975, the crane, nicknamed Goliath, Big Blue, The Dog or Horse, has a height of 100 m (330 ft), a span of 126 m (413 ft), a weight of 3,000 t (6,600,000 lb) and a lifting capacity of 1,200 t (2,600,000 lb). The cranes's re-assembly started in March 2009, and from 2010 it started operations. Since Damen took over, the crane is now painted yellow with Damen's logo.
