= List of container ships =

This is a list of container ships, both those in service and those which have ceased to operate. Container ships are a type of cargo ship that transports containers. For ships that have sailed under multiple names, their most recent name is used and former names are listed in the Notes section.

== Ultra Large Container Vessel (ULCV) ==
Name	Image	Type	Country	Owner	Year built	Tonnage	Notes	Status
Barzan		A18-class	Germany	United Arab Shipping Company	2015	195,636		In service
CMA CGM Antoine de Saint Exupery		Antoine de Saint Exupery-class	France	CMA CGM	2018	217,673		In service
CMA CGM Jacques Saadé		Jacques Saadé-class	France	CMA CGM	2020	236,583		In service
CSCL Globe		Globe-class	Hong Kong	COSCO Shipping	2014	184,605	Largest container ship until the completion of MSC Oscar	In service
Emma Maersk		E-class container ship	Denmark	Maersk Line	2006	170,794		In service
Ever Given		Evergreen G-class	Panama	Evergreen Marine Corporation	2018	217,612		In service
HMM Algeciras		HMM Algeciras-class	Panama	HMM	2020	228,283		In service
HMM Copenhagen		HMM Algeciras-class	Panama	HMM	2020	228,283		In service
Madrid Maersk		Triple E-class	Denmark	Maersk Line	2017	214,286		In service
Magleby Maersk		Triple E-class	Denmark	Maersk Line	2014	194,849		In service
Mærsk Mc-Kinney Møller		Triple E-class	Denmark	Maersk Line	2013	194,849	Largest container ship until the completion of CSCL Globe in 2014	In service
MOL Triumph		Triumph-class	Marshall Islands	Mitsui O.S.K. Lines	2017	192,672		In service
MSC Gülsün		Gülsün-class	Panama	Mediterranean Shipping Company	2019	232,618		In service
OOCL Germany		OOCL G-class	Hong Kong	OOCL	2017	210,890		In service
OOCL Hong Kong		OOCL G-class	Hong Kong	OOCL	2017	210,890		In service

== Panamax ==
Name	Image	Type	Country	Owner	Year built	Tonnage	Notes	Status
ZIM Rotterdam			Liberia	ZIM	2014	116,499		In service
Axel Mærsk		Maersk A-class	Denmark	Maersk Line	2003	93,496		In service
Chicago Express		Colombo Express-class	Germany	Hapag-Lloyd	2006	91,020		In service
Clementine Maersk		Maersk C-class	Denmark	Maersk Line	2002	91,921		In service
Colombo Express		Colombo Express-class	Germany	Hapag-Lloyd	2005	93,750		In service
Kyoto Express		Colombo Express-class	Germany	Hapag-Lloyd	2005	93,750		In service
NYK Vega		NYK Vega-class	Panama	Nippon Yusen Shipping	2006	97,825		In service
NYK Venus		NYK Vega-class	Panama	Nippon Yusen Shipping	2007	97,825		In service
NYK Vesta		NYK Vega-class	Panama	Nippon Yusen Shipping	2007	97,825		In service
NYK Virgo		NYK Vega-class	Panama	Nippon Yusen Shipping	2007	97,825		In service
Osaka Express		Colombo Express-class	Germany	Hapag-Lloyd	2006	93,750		In service

== Feeder ==
Name	Image	Type	Country	Owner	Year built	Tonnage	Notes	Status
Atlantic Causeway		Atlantic Causeway class	United Kingdom	Cunard Line	1969	`		Scrapped in 1986
Atlantic Conveyor		Atlantic Causeway class	United Kingdom	Cunard Line	1970	14,946		Sunk during the Falklands War.
Maj. Bernard F. Fisher			United States	Sealift Incorporated	1985	48,000	Formerly Sea Fox	In service
Maria Reina			Panama		1997	4,276	Formerly Steamers Future, Eagle Faith, Mekong Star, Stl Future, Baffin Strait, TransAtlantic	In service
Rena			Liberia	Daina Shipping Co.	1990	38,788	Formerly ZIM America, Andaman Sea	Broke in two after grounding on Astrolabe Reef, New Zealand, on 5 October 2011 partially scrapped on site.
Tygra		Maersk A-class	Liberia	Waterman Steamship Corporation	1998	14,120	Formerly Alva Maersk, Maersk Alabama, Maersk Andaman	In service
