= NYK Vega-class container ship =

Container ship class

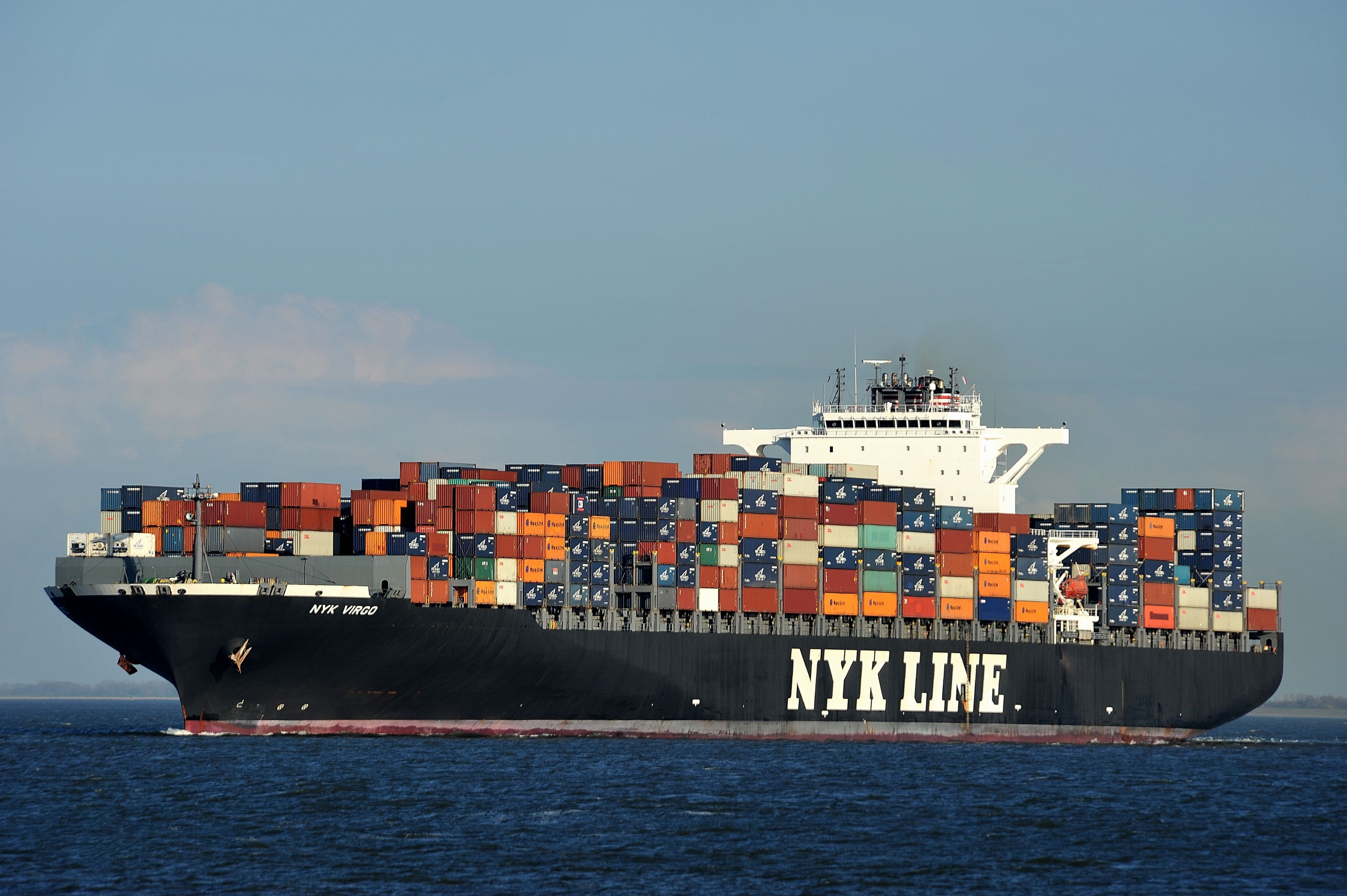
- NYK Virgo near Cuxhaven

Class overview
- Builders: Hyundai Heavy Industries
- Operators: Ocean Network Express
- In service: 2006–present
- Planned: 4
- Completed: 4
- Active: 4

General characteristics
- Type: Container ship
- Tonnage: 97,825 GT
- Length: 321 m (1,053 ft)
- Beam: 45.6 m (150 ft)
- Draught: 14.5 m (48 ft)
- Capacity: 9,012 TEU

The Vega class is a series of 4 container ships originally built for Nippon Yusen Kaisha (also known as NYK Line) and later operated by Ocean Network Express (ONE). The ships were built by Hyundai Heavy Industries in South Korea. The ships have a maximum theoretical capacity of around 9,012 twenty-foot equivalent units (TEU).

== List of ships ==
Ship	Yard number	IMO number	Delivery	Status	ref
NYK Vega	1714	9312781	1 Dec 2006	In service	
NYK Venus	1715	9312793	12 Mar 2007	In service	
NYK Vesta	1716	9312808	6 Mar 2007	In service	
NYK Virgo	1717	9312810	7 May 2007	In service	

== See also ==
- NYK bird-class container ship
