= Shanghai Express =

Shanghai Express may refer to:

- Shanghai Express (film), a 1932 film starring Marlene Dietrich, Clive Brook, and Anna May Wong
- Shanghai Express, an alternate title for Millionaires Express, a 1986 film directed by Sammo Hung
- Shanghai Express (ship), a container ship
- Shanghai Express (novel), a 1935 Chinese novel by Zhang Henshui, translated into English by William Lyell in 1997
