= Tsingtao (disambiguation) =

Tsingtao is an alternative, archaic name in English for Qingdao, China.

Tsingtao may also refer to:

- Tsingtao Brewery, which manufactures Tsingtao beer
- Tsingtao Express, a German ship
- The Siege of Tsingtao, an attack in Qingdao during World War I
