= Chicago Express (disambiguation) =

The Chicago Express is a former professional ice hockey team based in Hoffman Estates, Illinois.

Chicago Express may also refer to:

- Chicago Express Airlines, a former regional airline based out of Chicago Midway International Airport
- Chicago Express (basketball team), a former World Basketball League team
- Chicago Express (ship), a large container ship
