= Houston Express =

Houston Express may refer to:

- Houston Express (ship), a cargo ship
- Houston Express (soccer), a soccer club based in Houston, Texas
- Houston Express (album), a 1971 album by Houston Person
