= Shipping Corporation of India =

Indian government-owned shipping company

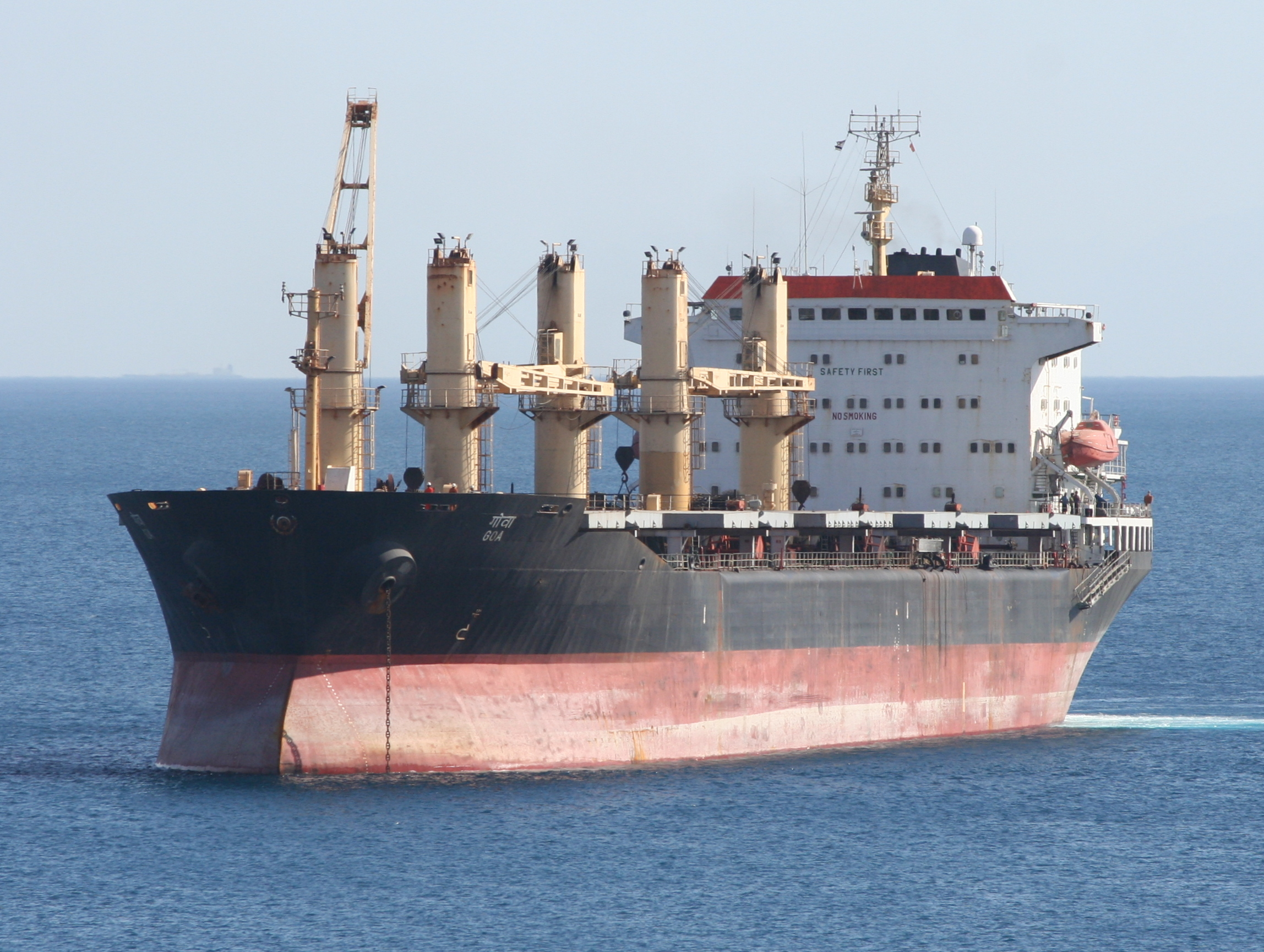
- MV Goa of SCI built by the Hindustan Shipyard in 1997
- Type: Public
- Traded as: BSE: 523598; NSE: SCI
- Industry: Shipping
- Founded: 2 October 1961; 65 years ago in Mumbai
- Headquarters: Mumbai, India
- Key people: Binesh Kumar Tyagi (Chairman & MD)
- Revenue: ▲₹5,300 crore (US$570 million) (2025)
- Net income: ▲₹843.58 crore (US$90 million) (2025)
- Total assets: ▼₹11,701 crore (US$1.3 billion) (2025)
- Total equity: ▲₹8,312 crore (US$890 million) (2025)
- Owner: Government of India (63.75%)
- Number of employees: ▲1393 (2025)
- Website: shipindia.com

The Shipping Corporation of India (SCI) is an Indian public sector undertaking that operates and manages vessels servicing both national and international lines. It is under the ownership of the Government of India and under administrative control of the Ministry of Ports, Shipping and Waterways, with its headquarters in Mumbai.

== History ==
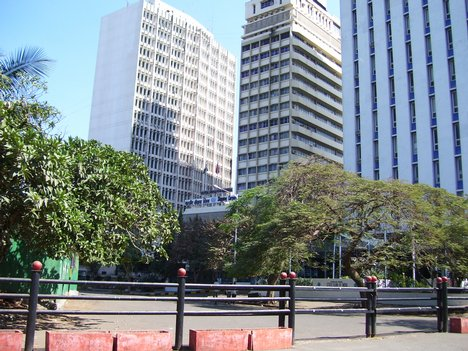
The headquarters of the Shipping Corporation of India at the Nariman Point, Mumbai

SCI was established on 2 October 1961 by the amalgamation of Eastern Shipping Corporation and Western Shipping Corporation. Two more shipping companies, Jayanti Shipping Company and Mogul Lines Limited, were merged with SCI in 1973 and 1986, respectively.

SCI started with 19 vessels. It gradually metamorphosed into a conglomerate having 80 ships of 59 lakh (5.9 million) tonnes deadweight (DWT) with interests in different segments of the shipping trade.

The fleet size of the merchant carrier had peaked at over 120 vessels which included liners, oil tankers, gas carriers, chemical tankers, passenger vessels, offshore vessels.

Inland & Coastal Shipping Ltd. (ICSL), SCI's wholly owned subsidiary, was incorporated in 2016 after the Maritime India summit for undertaking/providing transport services through Inland waterways and coastal shipping.

In year 2003, the company recruited their first ever girls batch, the batch TNOC35 had 3 girls Namrata Singh Tarkar, Anuradha Jha and Suneha Gadpande and rest 32 boys.

SCI has a fleet of 55 vessels as of August 2025.

== Fleet expansion ==
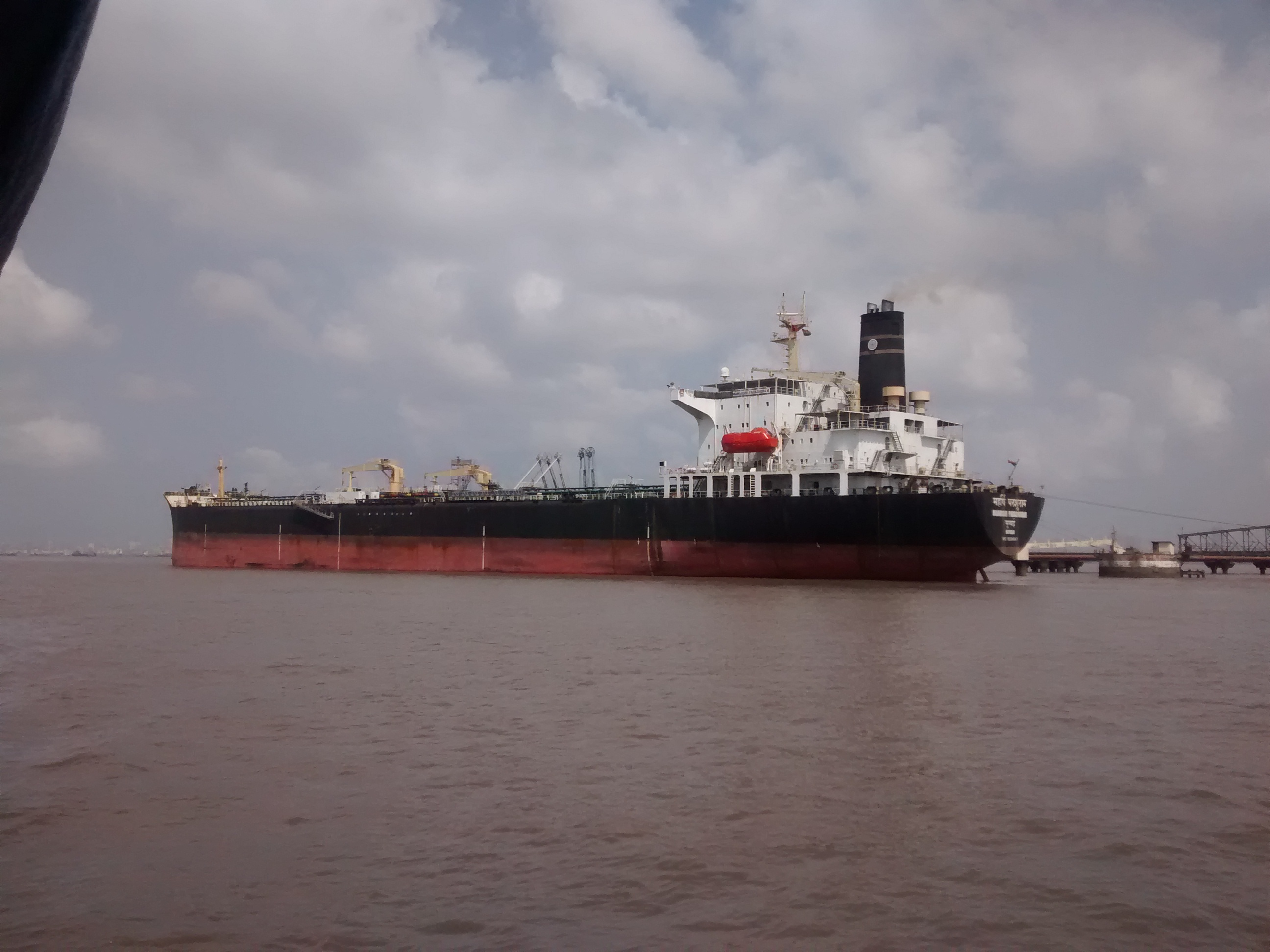
Maharshi Parashuram ship built in 2002 by the Cochin Shipyard for SCI

On 21 November 2019, the Government of India approved the privatisation of SCI. In 2022, the privatisation was delayed by the Russo-Ukraine war.

However, the privatisation of SCI was dropped as the government announced in May 2025 that the national merchant carrier would buy over 200 vessels of all types by forming a joint venture of the respective stakeholder, mostly state-owned. This included the procurement 112 tankers at a cost of ₹85,000 crore (equivalent to ₹880 billion or US$9.4 billion in 2026) through 2047. Of this, 79 vessels, including 30 medium-range ones, would be bought in the first phase. The initiative will support India's plans to expand oil refinery annual capacity from the current 250 million tons to 450 million tons by 2030. Simultaneously, it will also expand the indigenous tankers in the Indian fleet from 5% in 2025 to 7% in 2030 and 69% by 2047. The first order for 10 ships is expected to be issued in May itself.

In August 2025, SCI was planning to purchase 26 vessels at a cost of ₹19,820 crore (equivalent to ₹200 billion or US$2.2 billion in 2026). This will have a cumulative internal volume of 1.18 million gross tonnes. Overall, the firm plans to buy 207 vessels at ₹1.5 trillion (equivalent to ₹1.5 trillion or US$17 billion in 2026).

=== Very Large Gas Carriers ===
In January 2026, SCI issued an Expression of Interest to acquire 8 Very Large Gas Carriers (VLGC). Under the project, up to two ships can be delivered by an international shipyard, and the rest of 6 will be delivered by a local shipyard. The International shipyard must have experience of delivering at least 3 ships of the same class, VLGC, LNGC, or VLEC, in the past 5 years and should explain their plans for local collaboration for the latter 6 ships. Further, a bigger from a country sharing a land border with India must be registered with the Competent Authority to be eligible. The Press 3 Note is also applicable in order to keep a check on Chinese investments and participation. Swan Defence and Heavy Industries (SDHI) has partnered with Samsung Heavy Industries for the contract. The ships will be owned by a planned joint venture of SCI and four state-owned oil firms.

=== Medium-range product tanker ===
As of 23 February 2026, the carrier has floated a tender for a firm order of two dual-fuel, Medium Range Product Tanker for $200 million along with an option for two further vessels. An initial bid has been submitted by Cochin Shipyard Limited (CSL), Swan Defence and Heavy Industries (SDHI), L&T Shipbuilding (Kattupalli Shipyard) and a consortium of Garden Reach Shipbuilders & Engineers (GRSE) and Hindustan Shipyard Limited (HSL). While GRSE and HSL have formed a consortium, CSL, SDHI and L&T has formed an alliance with HD Korea Shipbuilding & Offshore Engineering, Samsung Heavy Industries and Hanwha Ocean, respectively, for the project. All of these allies are based in South Korea. L&T has also sought support from Seoul-based KmsEmec Co. Ltd., a ship designing firm. This is a maiden attempt to construct a locally grown tanker in decades. The tankers will be under the Suezmax category.

By October 2026, SDHI was expected to be awarded the contract at a cost of ₹1,897 crore (US$196 million) by an SCI-led joint venture of state shipping companies and stakeholders. The bids were opened on 9 October where Samsung Heavy Industries, the partner of SDHI, had quoted around US$48.9 million for each vessel with a cargo capacity of 17,000 to 18,000 tons. The partnership of CSL and HD Korea Shipbuilding had quoted a price of US$4 million more.

=== Platform supply vessel ===
On 18 March 2026, SCI signed a shipbuilding contract with the Mazagon Dock Shipbuilders to acquire one 3,000 deadweight tonnage (DWT) methanol dual-fuel platform supply vessel. This is the first green fuel ship to be acquired by the firm.

=== Feeder container ships ===
On 26 April 2026, SCI officially launched a invitation to tender from shipyards to acquire six methanol dual-fuel feeder container ships, each having a capacity to carry 1,700 twenty-foot equivalent units (TEUs) — at a cost of around $360 million. The contract will include two firm and four options ships. The local shipyards will have a "Right of First Refusal" (RoFR) to meet the lowest bid by a foreign shipyard and win the contract.

=== Cellular container ships ===
On 3 August 2026, SCI launched another tender for a contract of building two firm and four optional cellular container ships each with a capacity of 8,000 twenty-foot equivalent units (TEUs) at a cost of around $720 million. The tender will also have the RoFR feature for an advantage to local shipyards.

=== Summary ===
Recent procurement projects launched
Type	Qty	Capacity	Operators
Very Large Gas Carriers (VLGC)	8	88,000 cu. m (Note: butane, propane, LPG and ammonia)	Proposed JV with state-run oil firms
Suezmax tankers	2	155,000 DWT	SCI
Cellular container ships	6	18,000 TEUs	SCI (2) Bharat Container Shipping Line (4) (proposed)
Cellular container ships	6	8,000 TEUs	SCI

== Services ==
- Cruise liner and Passenger services
- Bulk carrier and tanker services
- Offshore services

== Major clients ==
- Bharat Heavy Electricals
- Bharat Petroleum
- BP
- British Gas
- Geological Survey of India
- Hindustan Petroleum
- Indian Oil Corporation
- Oil & Natural Gas Corporation
- Reliance Industries
- Shell
- Steel Authority of India
- Taj Cruises
- Tata tea

== See also ==
- Borders of India
- Container Corporation of India
- Coastal India
- Exclusive economic zone of India
- First girl batch in 2003: Namrata Singh Tarkar, Suneha Gadpande, and Anuradha Jha
- Fishing in India
