= MV Colombo Express =

German container ship

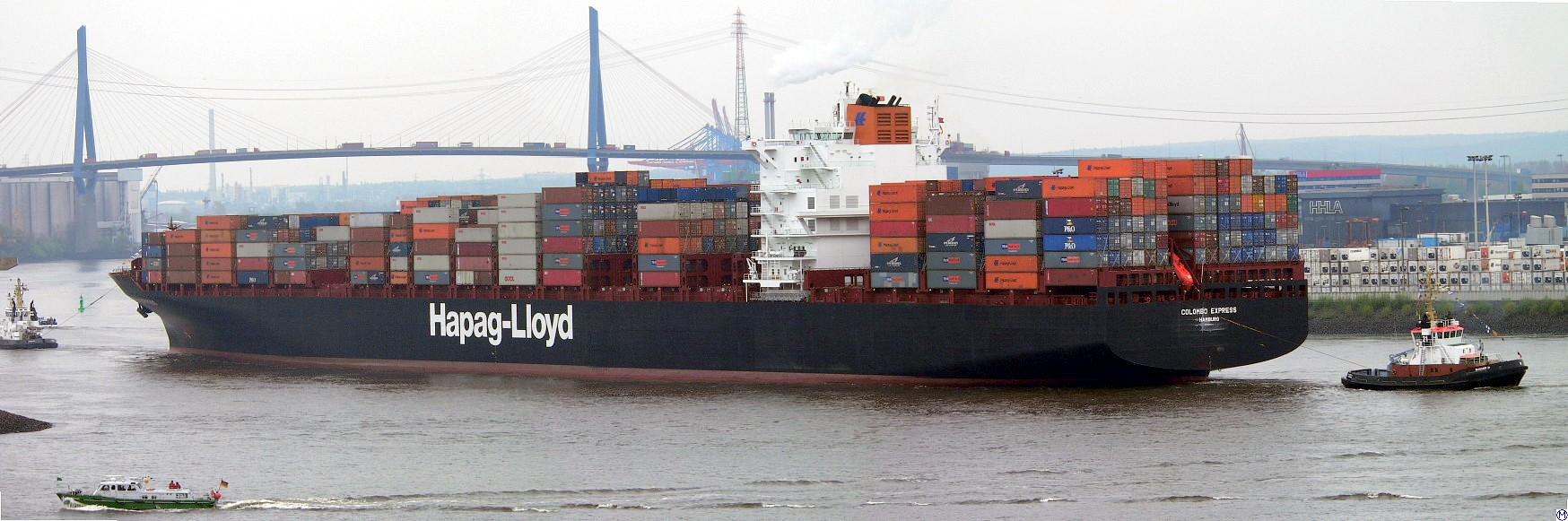
- Colombo Express on its maiden voyage to Hamburg, with the Köhlbrand bridge in the background, in April 2005

History
- Name: Colombo Express
- Owner: Hapag-Lloyd
- Operator: Hapag-Lloyd Container Line division
- Port of registry: Germany
- Route: North America to East Asia and vice versa
- Builder: Hyundai Heavy Industries
- Yard number: 1595
- Laid down: 1 November 2004
- Launched: 14 January 2005
- Christened: 11 April 2005
- Completed: 30 March 2005
- Identification: Call sign: DIHC; IMO number: 9295244; MMSI number: 211433000
- Status: Operational

General characteristics
- Class & type: Container ship
- Tonnage: 93,750 GT; 104,400 DWT
- Length: 334.0 m (1,095.8 ft)
- Beam: 42.0 m (137.8 ft)
- Depth: 24.5 m (80 ft)
- Installed power: MAN-B&W 12K98ME diesel engine, 68640 kW
- Propulsion: 1 fixed propeller
- Speed: 20 kn (37 km/h; 23 mph)
- Capacity: 8749 TEUs

Colombo Express is a container ship. When launched in 2005, she was claimed by her owner to be the world's largest container ship, a title she held until Emma Mærsk was launched in 2006.

Colombo Express holds 8,749 twenty-foot equivalent units (TEU), 730 refrigerated (reefer) TEUs, is 335 metres (1,099 ft) long, and has a beam, or width, of 43 metres (140 ft). She is owned by the German shipping company Hapag-Lloyd, and operated by its Hapag-Lloyd Container Line division. She is named for Colombo, the largest city in Sri Lanka, which the predecessor company, North American Lloyd, first called on in 1886. She is the first of eight proposed Colombo Express class vessels, and is only slightly larger (approximately 4%) than her Savannah Express class cousins, the 8400 TEU (700 reefer) ships Savannah Express and Houston Express.

Colombo Express has a gross tonnage of 93,750 and had a deadweight capacity of 104,400 tonnes. Her rated speed is 25.0 knots (46.3 km/h). Built in South Korea by Hyundai Heavy Industries in 2004–2005, she was christened on 11 April 2005, and her diesel engine generates 69,700 kilowatts (93,500 hp) of power.

Colombo Express operates out of the home port of Hamburg, and will mainly travel from Europe to Southeast Asia and back in 56-day round-trips.

== Collision with Maersk Tanjong ==
On 29 September 2014, Colombo Express was involved in a collision with MV Maersk Tanjong, sustained a 20-metre (65 ft) dent to its left side and causing delays to traffic through the Suez Canal. Footage of the incident was caught on video by a spectator and posted on YouTube.

== Colombo Express class ==
Colombo Express class ships:

- Bremen Express
- Chicago Express
- Colombo Express
- Hanover Express
- Kuala Lumpur Express
- Kyoto Express
- Osaka Express
- Tsingtao Express
