= Yantian Express =

Container ship

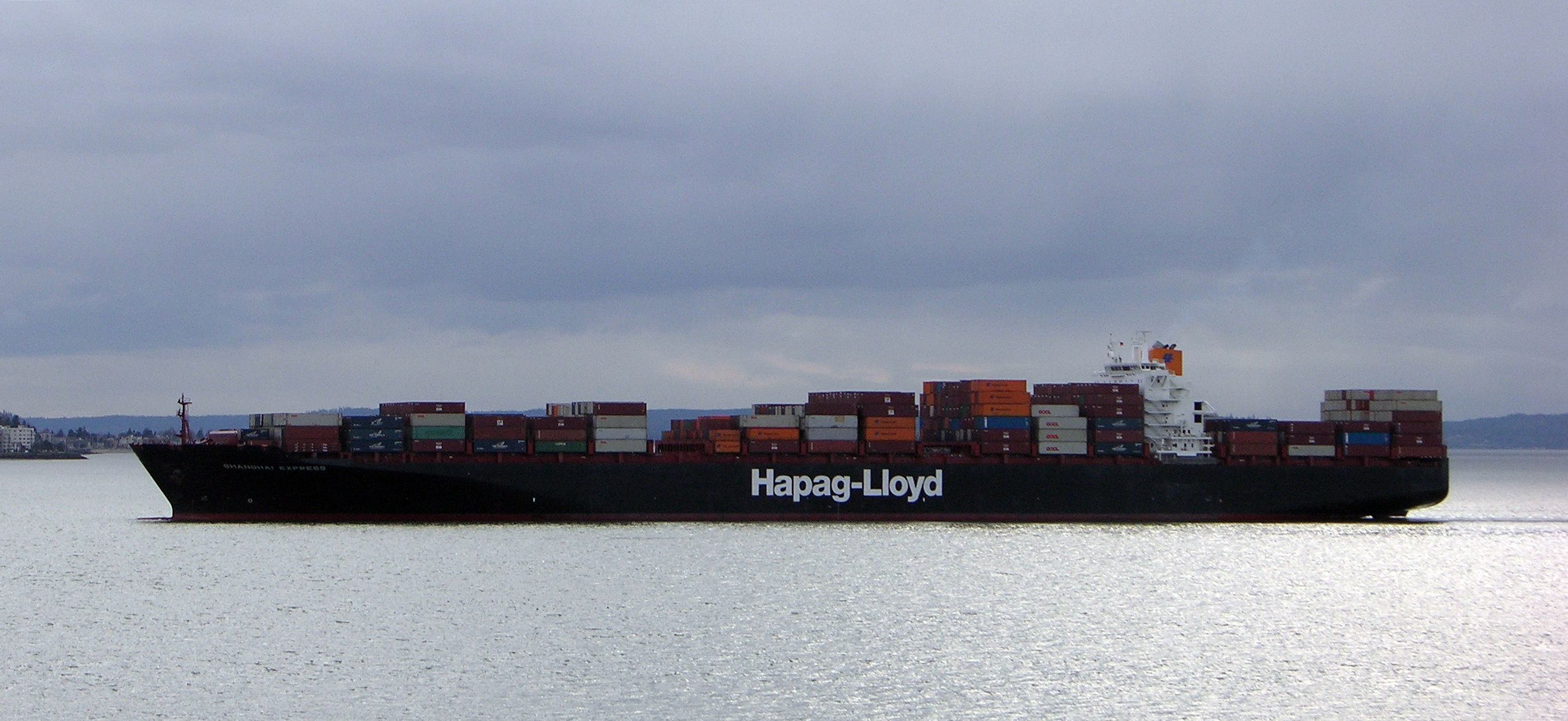

History
- Name: Yantian Express (2012–); Shanghai Express (2002–2012); Berlin Express (2002)
- Owner: Hapag-Lloyd AG
- Operator: Hapag-Lloyd Container Linie
- Port of registry: Germany, Hamburg
- Builder: Hyundai Heavy Industries; Ulsan, South Korea
- Yard number: 1364
- Launched: 28 December 2001
- In service: 2002
- Identification: Call sign: DPCK; IMO number: 9229831; MMSI number: 211367460
- Status: In service

General characteristics
- Type: Container ship
- Tonnage: 88,493 GT; 36,175 NT; 100,003 DWT
- Length: 321 m (1,053 ft)
- Beam: 42 m (138 ft)
- Installed power: 49,300 kW (66,100 hp)
- Speed: 22.5 kn (41.7 km/h; 25.9 mph)
- Capacity: 7,510 TEU

Yantian Express is a Hapag-Lloyd Hamburg Express-class container ship, delivered in 2002. She was constructed by Hyundai Heavy Industries in Ulsan, South Korea, a measures 320 by 43 m (1,050 by 141 ft), and delivered under the name Berlin Express but soon renamed Shanghai Express. Her capacity is 7,510 20ft containers and she carries this load at 22.5 knots (41.7 km/h; 25.9 mph).

As of December 2022, other Hamburg Express class ships included Hamburg Express, New York Express, Basle Express, Hong Kong Express, Essen Express, Antwerpen Express, Leverkusen Express, Ludwigshafen Express, and Ulsen Express.

As Shanghai Express, the ship was featured in an episode of Mighty Ships on The Discovery Channel in 2004.

== Incidents ==
On 3 January 2019 the Yantian Express suffered from a fire event aboard. The ship was en route from Colombo (Sri Lanka) to Halifax when the fire broke out about 800 nm from the Canadian coast. All 23 seamen were evacuated on 7 January 2019 by the tow-boat "Smit Nicobar". Seven days after the fire broke out the salvage team was able to bring the fire under control and bring back five seamen aboard the ship.

On 25 January 2019 the vessel's operators, Hapag-Lloyd, declared general average and placed stakeholders in the ship and its cargo on notice for liability for salvage costs.

Also on 25 January 2019 the Yantain Express got underway on her own power en route to her port of refuge, Freeport, Bahamas.
