= Houston Express (ship) =

Cargo ship

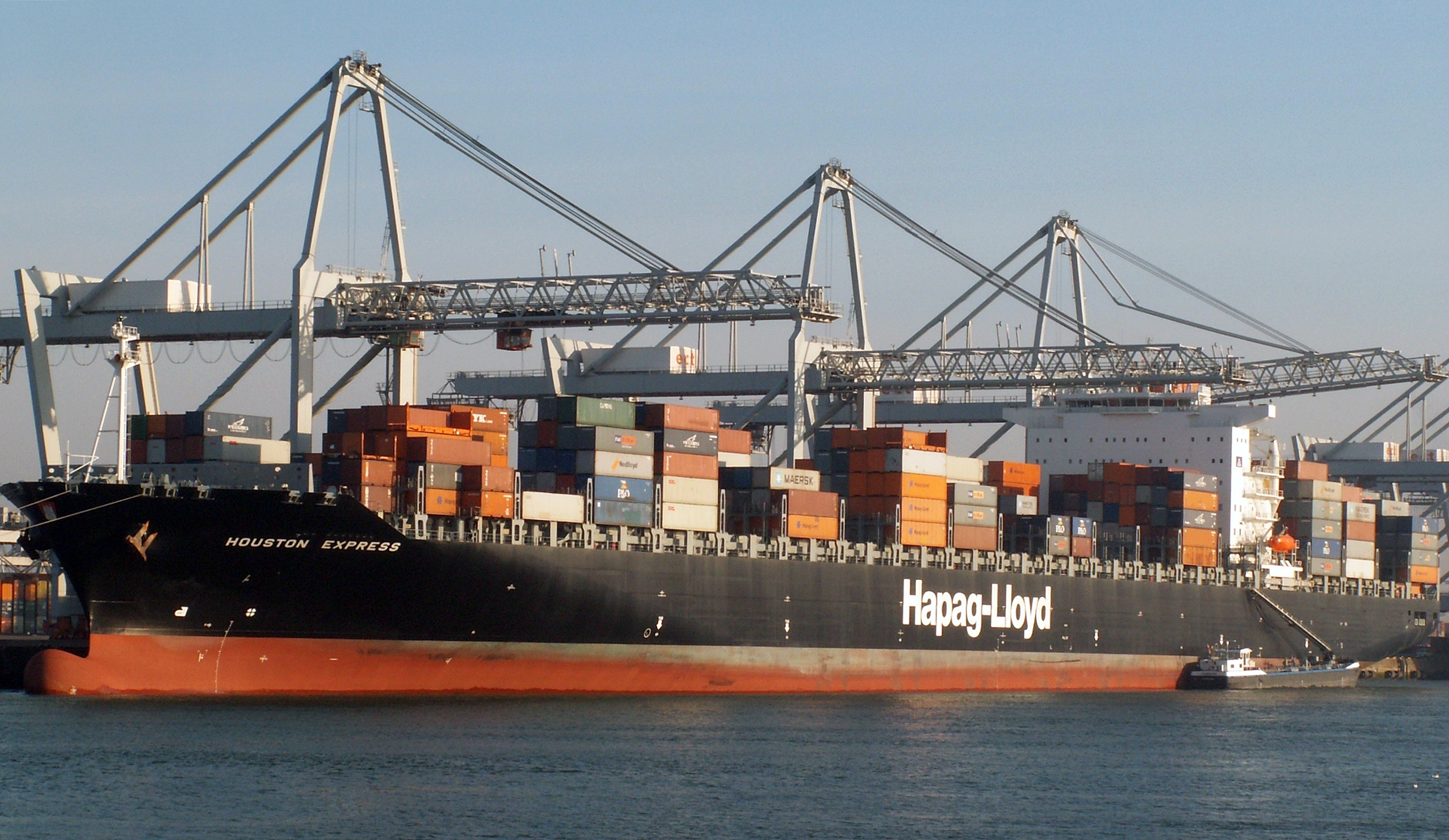
- Houston Express leaving the Port of Rotterdam, the Netherlands, on 23 January 2006

History

Germany
- Name: Houston Express
- Operator: Hapag-Lloyd, Hamburg
- Port of registry: Hamburg
- Builder: Daewoo Shipbuilding & Marine Engineering, Okpo, South Korea
- Yard number: 4103
- Laid down: 20 December 2004
- Launched: 30 April 2005
- Completed: 31 August 2005
- Identification: IMO number: 9667150; Call sign: DCCR2
- Status: In active service

General characteristics
- Type: Container ship
- Tonnage: 94,483 GT; 55,670 NT; 108,106 DWT
- Length: 332.41 m (1,090 ft 7 in) o/a
- Beam: 43.2 m (141 ft 9 in)
- Draught: 14.5 m (47 ft 7 in)
- Depth: 20.22 m (66 ft 4 in)
- Propulsion: 1 × 68,520 kW (91,890 hp) MAN 12K98ME-C 12-cylinder two-stroke diesel engine, 1 shaft
- Speed: 25 knots (46 km/h; 29 mph)
- Capacity: 8,400 TEU
- Crew: 30

Houston Express is a cargo ship owned by the Hapag-Lloyd company of Hamburg, Germany, completed in 2005. The ship is capable of transporting up to 8,400 containers at any one time. The Deadweight Tonnage is 107,000 metric tons and the maximum speed of this ship is 25 knots (46 km/h). The ship is 332 meters long and has a beam (or width) of 43.20 meters. The engines are capable of outputting 68,520 kilowatts of power.

The Houston Express, as well as her sister ships Savannah Express and Mærsk Stralsund, are owned by Norddeutsche Vermögen and managed by Norddeutsche Reederei H. Schuldt. The ships have been built in a series of five vessels. They feature the first twisted leading edge full spade rudder (TLKSR) of Becker Marine Systems. The 67sqm rudder avoids rudder cavitation and saves 2% fuel.

In April 2015, the Houston Express rescued a 37-year-old man, Louis Jordan, whose capsized boat had left him adrift for 66 days.
