= Hamburg Express-class container ship =

Container ship class

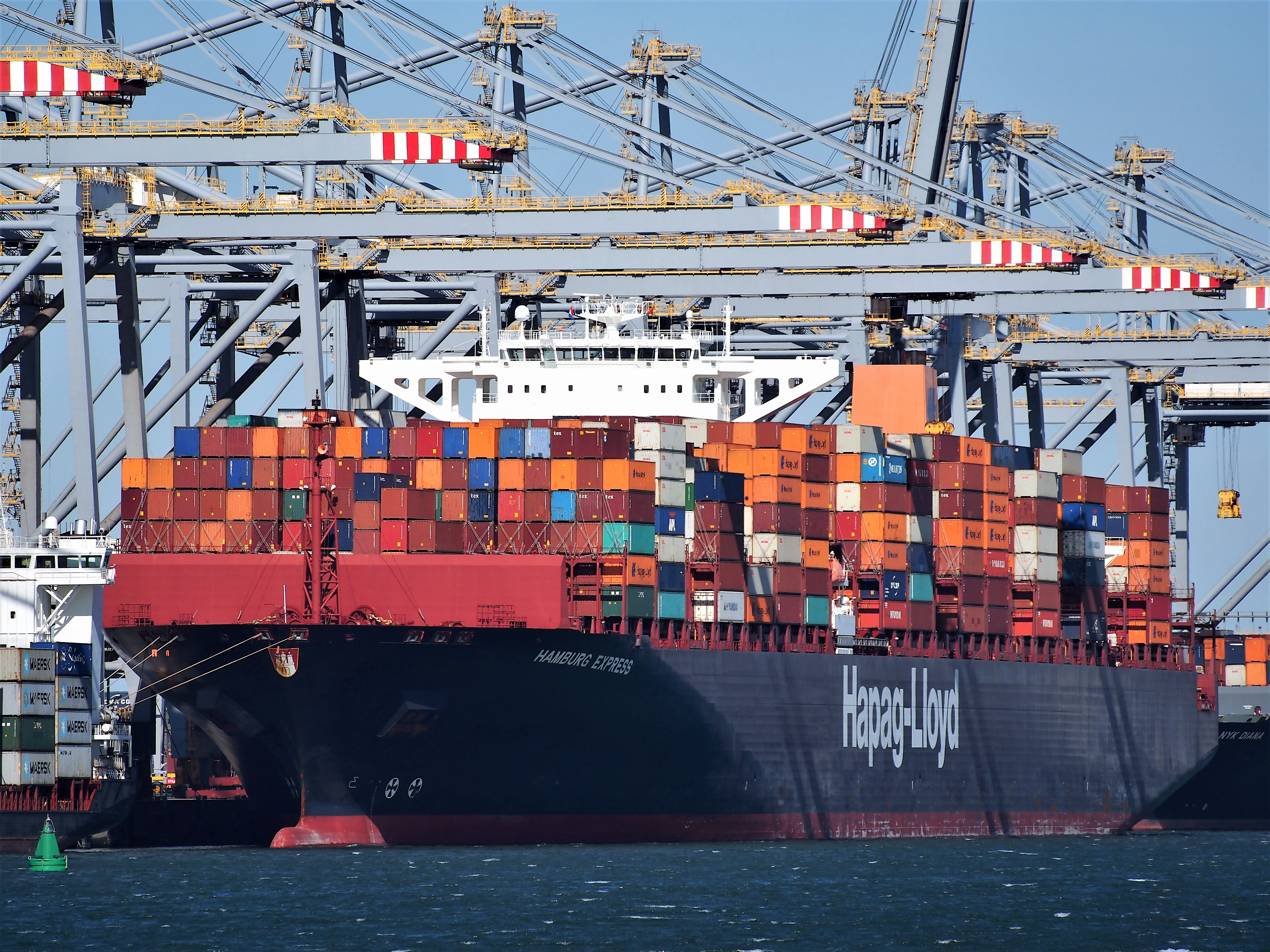
- Hamburg Express in the port of Rotterdam

Class overview
- Builders: Hyundai Heavy Industries
- Operators: Hapag-Lloyd
- In service: 2012-present
- Planned: 10
- Building: 0
- Completed: 10
- Active: 10

General characteristics
- Type: Container ship
- Tonnage: 143,262 GT
- Length: 366.52 m (1,202 ft)
- Beam: 48.35 m (159 ft)
- Draught: 15.5 m (51 ft)
- Capacity: 13,177 TEU

The Hamburg Express class is a series of 10 container ships built for Hapag-Lloyd. The ships were built by Hyundai Heavy Industries in South Korea. The ships have a maximum theoretical capacity of 13,177 TEU.

== List of ships ==
Ship	Yard number	IMO number	Delivery	Status	ref
Hamburg Express	2241	9461051	5 Jul 2012	In service	
New York Express	2242	9501332	28 Sep 2012	In service	
Basle Express	2243	9501344	15 Nov 2012	In service	
Hong Kong Express	2244	9501356	28 Feb 2013	In service	
Yantian Express	2245	9501368	26 Mar 2013	In service	
Essen Express	2246	9501370	16 May 2013	In service	
Antwerpen Express	2497	9501370	27 Jun 2013	In service	
Leverkusen Express	2498	9613006	13 Mar 2014	In service	
Ludwigshafen Express	2499	9613018	3 Apr 2014	In service	
Ulsan Express	2500	9613020	24 Apr 2014	In service	

== See also ==
Valparaiso Express-class container ship
