= Hong Kong Express (ship) =

Container ship

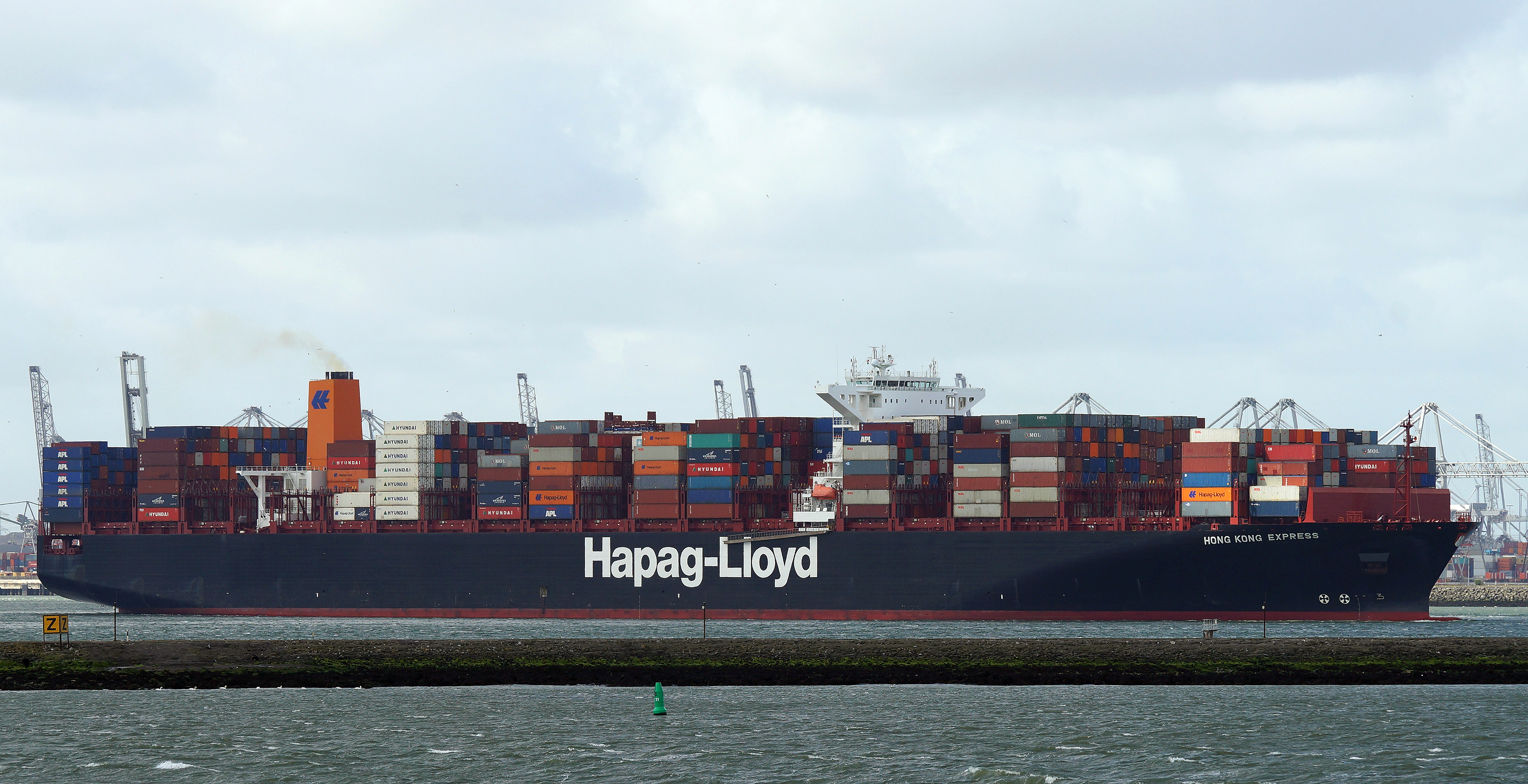

History
- Name: Hong Kong Express
- Owner: Hapag Lloyd
- Operator: Hapag Lloyd Container Linie
- Port of registry: Hamburg Germany
- Route: Far East – Europe
- Builder: Hyundai Heavy Industries Co., Ltd Ulsan, South Korea
- Yard number: 2244
- Launched: 21 December 2012
- Completed: 2013
- Identification: IMO number: 9501356; MMSI number: 218426000; Call sign: DJAZ2
- Status: In service

General characteristics
- Class & type: Hamburg Express-class container ship
- Tonnage: GT 142295, NT 60481, DWT 127,170
- Length: 366.50 m (1,202.4 ft)
- Beam: 48.20 m (158.1 ft)
- Draft: 15.50 m (50.9 ft)
- Installed power: 68,840 kW (92,320 hp)
- Propulsion: MAN B&W 12K 98ME-C7
- Speed: 24.6 knots (45.6 km/h; 28.3 mph)
- Capacity: 13092 TEU

Hong Kong Express is a fully cellular container ship of the Hamburg Express Class owned and operated by the German shipping company Hapag-Lloyd Container Linie.

== Hull and engine ==
Hong Kong Express was completed in March 2013 by Hyundai Heavy Industries in their shipyard in Ulsan South Korea. The vessel, which is operated by German shipping company Hapag Lloyd Container Linie has a capacity of 13,092 TEU and 800 reefer plugs for carrying of refrigerated containers. The ship has an overall length of 366.50 m (1,202.4 ft), beam of 48.20 m (158.1 ft) and a maximum draft of 15.50 m (50.9 ft). Her deadweight is 127,170 DWT, gross tonnage is 142,295 GT and net tonnage is 60,481 NT.

The main engine is MAN B&W 12K 98ME-C7, which has total output of 68,840 kW (92,320 hp). The engine turns a single screw or one propeller which is of a tunnel thruster design with rudder-fin. Hong Kong Express has a service speed of 24.6 kts, while the maximum speed exceeds 25.5 kts.

== Accidents ==
On September 29, 2015 the container ship Hong Kong Express collided with general cargo ship BBS Sky in the North Sea 10 nautical miles off the Netherlands. The accident happened during overtaking, when both ships were running in same direction. There were slight scratches at the ship's hull, but Hong Kong Express resumed her voyage from Rotterdam to Hamburg.

On 2 June 2020, Hong Kong Express was involved in an incident during discharge operations at the port of Jeddah. The ship and some containers were damaged but no personnel was injured.
