= ZIM Rotterdam =

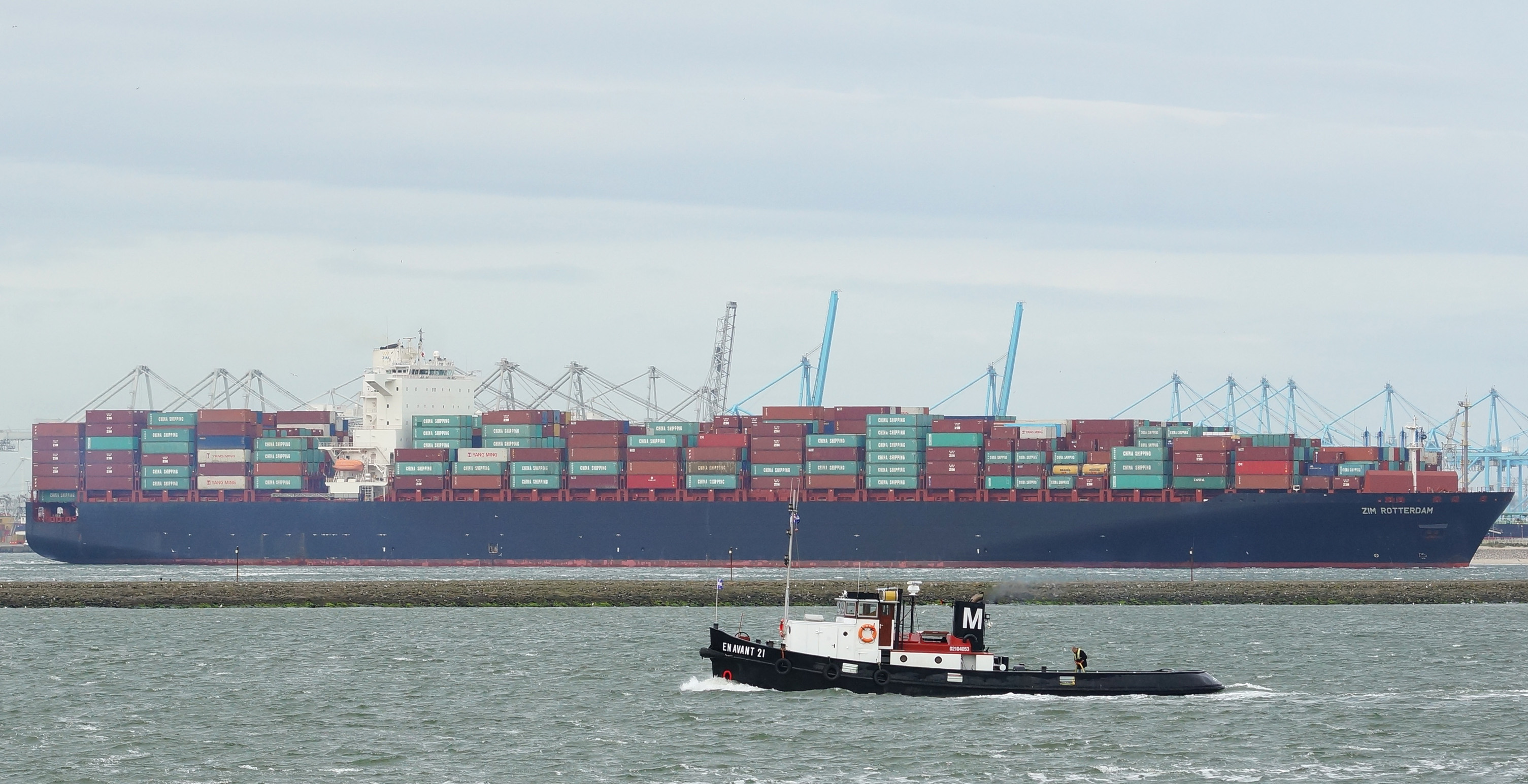
- ZIM Rotterdam pictured in Rotterdam

History

Liberia
- Name: ZIM Rotterdam
- Namesake: Rotterdam, Holland
- Owner: ZIM
- Operator: Pelican Maritime, LTD
- Port of registry: Monrovia
- Builder: Hyundai Samho Heavy Industries Co. LTD, Yeongam, South Korea
- Yard number: 347
- Launched: January 3, 2010
- Identification: IMO number: 9398450; MMSI number: 636014222; Callsign: A8SI8
- Status: Active

General characteristics
- Displacement: 37,827 t (37,230 long tons)
- Length: 349 m (1,145 ft 0 in) o/a
- Beam: 46 m (150 ft 11 in)
- Draft: 14.2–15 m (46 ft 7 in – 49 ft 3 in)
- Installed power: 68.64 MW (92,050 hp)
- Propulsion: MAN-B&W 12K98MC-C
- Speed: 24.8 knots (45.9 km/h; 28.5 mph) maximum

ZIM Rotterdam is a container ship owned by ZIM and operated by Pelican Maritime, LTD. She was built and delivered in 2010 and has served continuously since. Her summer deadweight is 116,449 tons, and she is registered in Monrovia, Liberia. Her cargo capacity is 10,062 TEU.

Her sister ships are ZIM Antwerp, ZIM Tianjin, and others.

== Incidents and controversy ==
On August 23, 2013, a small fire broke out in the engine room. While quickly contained, it was enough to stop the ship for a short while. Following this she was denied entry into the Suez Canal until maintenance had been completed.

In May 2024, the ZIM Rotterdam docked at Port Klang despite a Malaysian ban on Israeli ships due to the currently ongoing Gaza war. This led to controversy surrounding the legitimacy and enforcement of the ban, and the ZIM Rotterdam departed later that week. Prime Minister of Malaysia Anwar Ibrahim claimed the ZIM Rotterdam did not dock, and that it was an earlier MarineTraffic record from 2002; however, MarineTraffic records do not go back this far, and the ZIM Rotterdam was built in 2010.

== Records ==
On September 20, 2013 she became the largest vessel to enter the Thames, although this record was short-lived, as of 2024 being held by Edith Mærsk. She called into Gateway Terminal at 1800 hours for required maintenance.

The ship was the largest container vessel to call at Jacksonville Port for several years; until May 2023, when One Stork, a ship capable of carrying 14,000 containers, made its maiden call to the port.
