= Chicago Express (ship) =

Container ship built in 2006

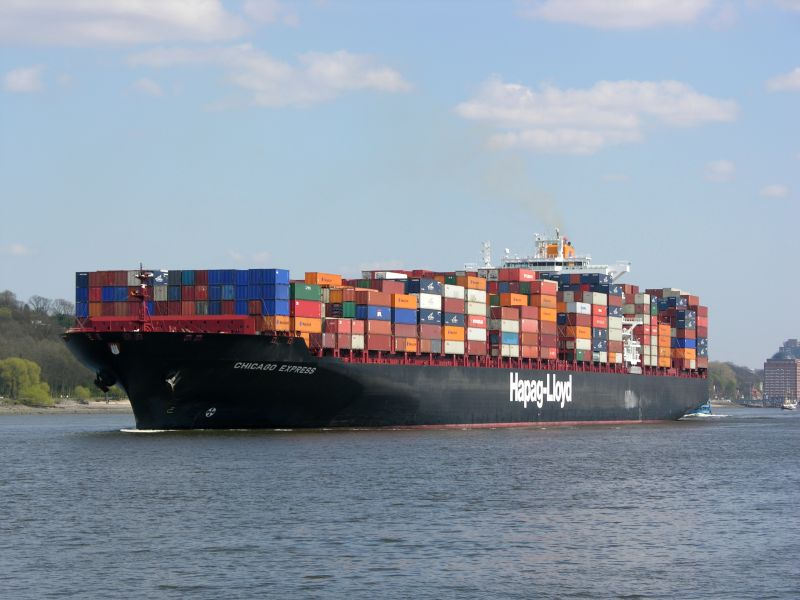
- Chicago Express departing from Hamburg

History
- Name: Chicago Express
- Owner: Hapag Lloyd
- Operator: Hapag Lloyd Container Linie
- Port of registry: Hamburg Germany
- Route: Far East – Europe
- Builder: Hyundai Heavy Industries Co., Ltd Ulsan, South Korea
- Yard number: H1597
- Launched: 9 December 2005
- Completed: 2006
- Identification: IMO number: 9295268; MMSI number: 211839000; Call Sign: DCUJ2
- Status: In service

General characteristics
- Class & type: Colombo Express Class container ship
- Tonnage: GT 91,020, NT 100,000, DWT 103890
- Length: 336.19 m (1,103.0 ft)
- Beam: 42.80 m (140.4 ft)
- Draft: 12.4 m (41 ft), 12.4 m (41 ft)(max)
- Depth: 24.6 m (81 ft)
- Installed power: 68,640 kW (92,050 hp)
- Propulsion: B&W 12K98ME Diesel
- Speed: 24.5 knots (45.4 km/h; 28.2 mph)
- Capacity: 8749 TEU

Chicago Express is a container ship for the Hapag Lloyd Container Line, and is one of eight in the Colombo Express class.

== Hull and engine ==
The Chicago Express is a fully cellular container ship built in 2006 by Hyundai Heavy Industries Co., Ltd., in Ulsan, South Korea. Her gross tonnage is 91,020, her net tonnage is 100,000, and her deadweight is 103,890. She is 336.19 m (1,103.0 ft) long and is 42.80 m (140.4 ft) at the beam. Her draught is 12.4 m (41 ft), her draft is 12.4 m (41 ft), her depth is 24.6 m (81 ft). The Chicago Express has a TEU capacity of 8749, with plugs for 730 reefer containers.

The Chicago Express is powered by Kawasaki-MAN B&W 12K98ME. These engines are two stroke and have twelve cylinders. The engine turns a single screw or one propeller which is tunnel thruster design. The engine can produce 68,640 kW (92,050 horsepower) of power.

== Training role ==
The Chicago Express is not only a cargo ship, but also a training ship. On September 5, 2006, eight nautical officer cadets stepped on board the Chicago Express in order to get real-life training and progress their future in the industry. In October, the ship also welcomed aboard seven mechanic apprentices. The cadets sailed with the Chicago Express for one year to fulfill their training requirement.

== Fatal design flaw ==
In September 2008, the Chicago Express was sailing out of Hong Kong when it ran into a typhoon. The resulting storm initially caused the ship to go in a parametric roll, in which the ship rocked side to side 32 degrees. To decrease this effect, the ship master was able to change direction of the ship and brought the rolls down to 20 degrees. The ship encountered a sudden wave which made the ship list at 44 degrees for 10 seconds. Everyone on the bridge was "catapulted across the bridge", the report said, except the second officer. A Filipino AB on the bridge succumbed to his wounds sustained during the incident and was pronounced dead, while the master was airlifted to Hong Kong for treatment of serious injuries. An investigation of this event revealed that there was not a sufficient number of handrails on the bridge of the ship. The incident and other similar ones caused the ship designers to question some new ship designs.

== Illegal cargo ==
The Chicago Express was caught up in a shipping scandal in a port in Hampshire. Officials found a banned sweet that caused the deaths of four children earlier in the year in a couple of containers from the ship. This gave the officials probable cause to search the rest of the ship's cargo, in which they also found illegally imported goods such as 20,000 cigarettes, shrimp paste, condensed milk and beef jerky. The companies that tried to import the illegal goods got a notice for the destruction of the goods and Customs and Excise was set to charge them for the service.
