= Becker Marine Systems =

German marine technology company

Becker Marine Systems GmbH
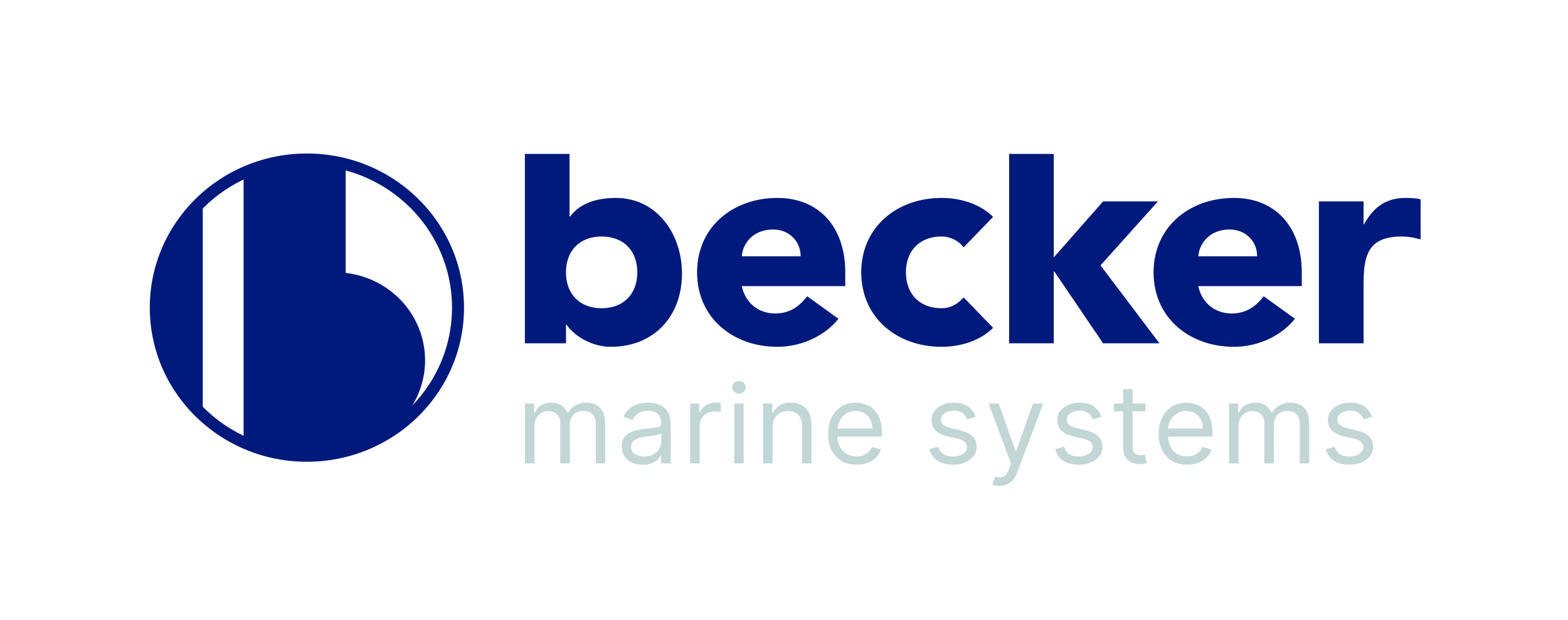
- Type: GmbH
- Industry: Marine technology
- Founded: 1946
- Headquarters: Hamburg, Germany
- Key people: Henning Kuhlmann, Dr. Tobias Haack
- Revenue: €168.6 million (2023)
- Number of employees: 114 (2023)
- Website: becker-marine-systems.com

Becker Marine Systems is a German manufacturer of ship and marine technology based in Hamburg. The company develops and produces manoeuvring and monitoring systems.

== History ==
The company was founded in 1946 by Willi Becker in Hamburg. In its first years, Becker Marine Systems was active in developing rudders. The Becker Rudder was introduced in the 1950s and improved ship manoeuvrability. With the development of the Becker Flap Rudder, a fin-type rudder with a potential angle of deflection up to 100 degrees, the company expanded its services to larger vessels by adapting the rudder design to meet the requirements of bigger ships. With the 1972 acquisition of Kort Engineering, Becker entered the market for specialised nozzles and rudders.

In the following years, Becker opened its own offices in China, South Korea, and Singapore. This expansion led to major contracts, such as the production of rudders for six large container ships from STX in 2009. During this period, the company's management underwent changes which resulted in an increased revenue from around €25 million in 2006 to approximately €100 million in 2009.

Also in 2009, Becker launched the Becker Mewis Duct, a device that improves the inflow to propellers. The engineers of the device, Mewis and Lehmann, were later awarded the German Environmental Prize for their invention.

In 2015, Becker began operations in the United States, followed by a contract from the United States Navy to equip 17 new tankers with rudders in 2017. The same year, Becker began a collaboration in Japan with local companies for the construction of rudders for container ships.

=== Takeover by Nakashima Propeller ===
In April 2021, the Japanese company Nakashima Propeller Co. Ltd. acquired a majority stake in Becker Marine Systems. Nakashima had previously been a partner of Becker Marine Systems since 1978. Becker Marine Systems remained unchanged in its structure, including its management.

== Corporate structure ==
Becker Marine Systems GmbH is headquartered in Hamburg and is part of Nakashima Europe (Germany) GmbH. Their ultimate parent company is Nakashima Propeller Co. Ltd., based in Okayama, Japan. In the 2023 financial year, the company generated sales of €168.6 million and employed an average of 114 employees in Germany. Globally, Becker employs over 200 people. Its key markets are Asia, Europe, and North America, with the majority of its 2023 revenue generated in Asia.

In addition to its headquarters in Hamburg, Becker Marine Systems operates several subsidiaries in China (Zhenjiang, Nanjing, and Shanghai), Singapore, South Korea (Busan), Norway (Oslo), and the United States (Texas).
