= Tsingtao Express =

Ship owned by Hapag-Lloyd

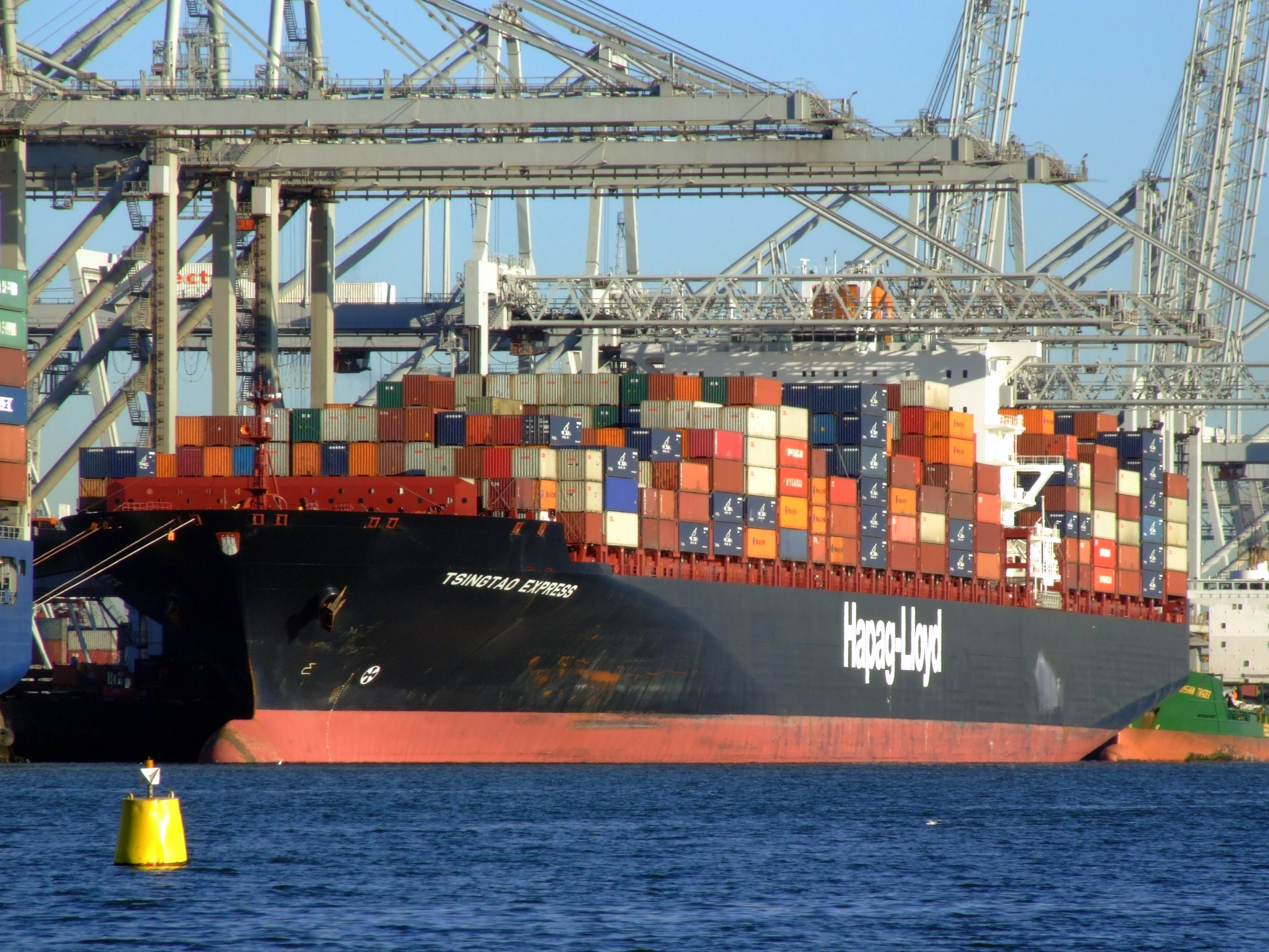

History
- Name: Tsingtao Express
- Owner: Hapag-Lloyd AG
- Operator: Hapag-Lloyd
- Port of registry: HamburgGermany
- Builder: Hyundai Heavy Industries CO Ltd
- Yard number: 1741
- Launched: 16 February 2007
- Christened: 26 April 2007
- Completed: April 2007
- Identification: IMO number: 9320702; MMSI number: 218063000; Callsign: DDYL2
- Status: In service

General characteristics
- Class & type: GL
- Tonnage: 93,750 GT 103,631 DWT
- Length: 335.47m
- Beam: 42.80m
- Draught: 14.610m
- Depth: 24.60m
- Decks: 1
- Installed power: 93,323hp
- Propulsion: MAN B&W
- Speed: 20 kn
- Capacity: 8,749 TEU, 730 TEU reefer containers

Tsingtao Express is owned by Hapag-Lloyd, one of the largest container ship companies in the world. The ship is registered in Hamburg, Germany.

== Hull and engine ==
The Tsingtao Express is 335.47 m long, with a beam of 42.80 m, and draught of 14,610 m. This ship has a double bottom design giving it a capacity of 8749 TEU, 730 of which may be refrigerated containers. It was completed and christened on April 26, 2007.

The ship is powered by a MAN B&W two-stroke engine with 12 cylinders, capable of producing 93,323 hp driving open fixed pitch propeller. The ship was originally constructed with five auxiliary generators. Two 4,267 kW, one 2,454 kW, one 4,000 kW, and one 1,867 kW.
