= Osaka Express =

Container ship

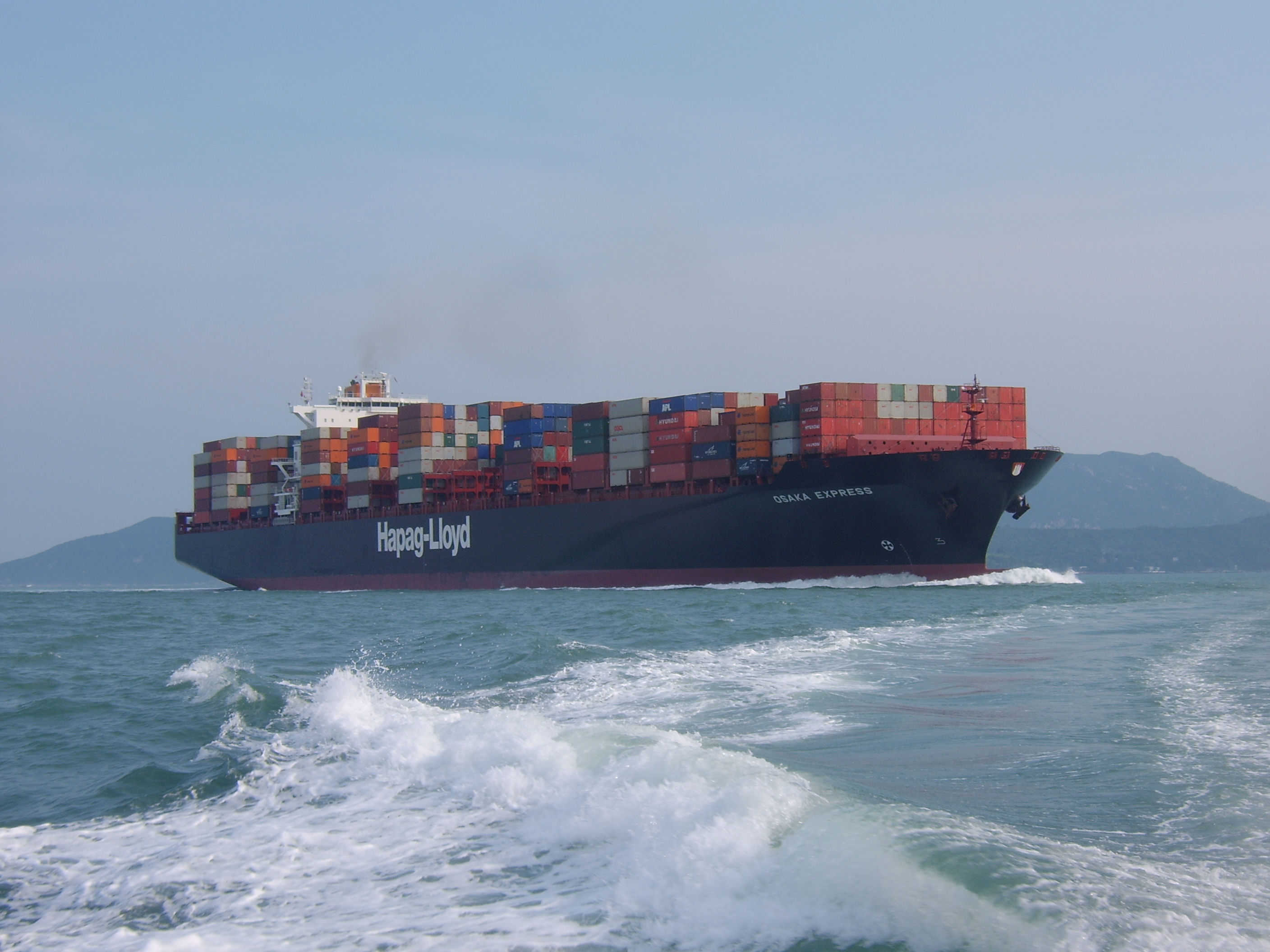
- Osaka Express Container Ship

History
- Name: Osaka Express
- Owner: Hapag-Lloyd, Germany
- Operator: Hapag-Lloyd
- Port of registry: (Germany) Hamburg
- Launched: 8 December 2006
- Identification: IMO number: 9320697; Call sign : DDVK2
- Status: in active service

General characteristics
- Class & type: Colombo Express-class container ship
- Tonnage: 93,750 GT; 37,699 NT; 103,662 LT DWT
- Length: 335 m (1,099 ft) o/a
- Beam: 43 m (141 ft 1 in)
- Propulsion: 68,640 kW (92,048 hp)
- Speed: 25 knots (46 km/h; 29 mph)
- Capacity: 8,749 TEU

Osaka Express (built in 2007) is a container ship operated by the shipping company Hapag-Lloyd. This vessel has a capacity of 8749 twenty-foot equivalent units (TEU) and 103,800 tonnes deadweight (DWT). It can achieve a speed of 25 kn. It belongs to the Colombo Express class of ships.
