= Kyoto Express =

Liberian flagged container ship operated by Hapag-Lloyd

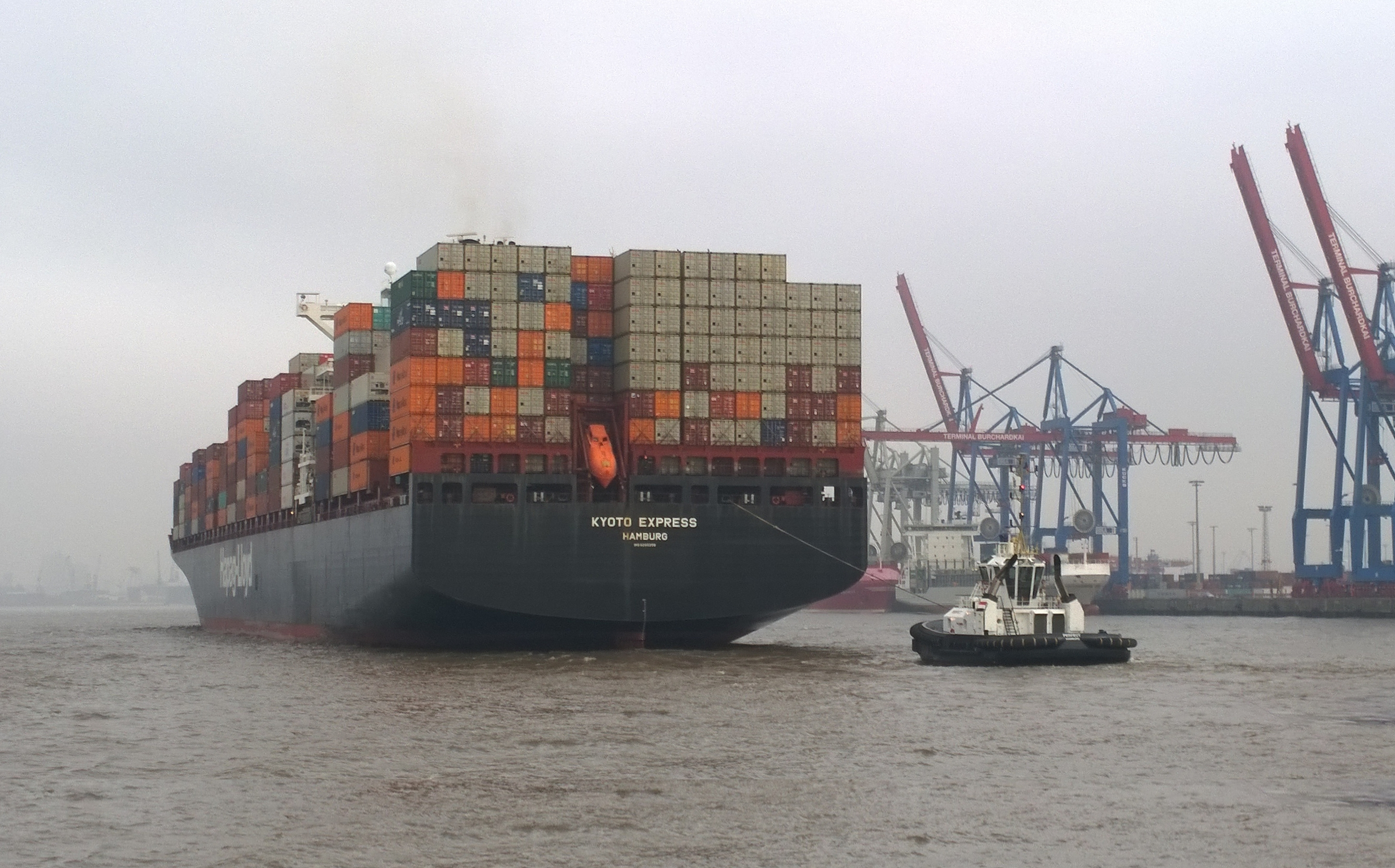
- The Kyoto Express in the port of Hamburg

History
- Name: Kyoto Express
- Owner: Hapag-Lloyd AG
- Operator: Hapag-Lloyd AG
- Port of registry: Monrovia, Liberia
- Route: Between Europe and the Far East
- Builder: Hyundai Heavy Industries Co. Ltd., Ulsan, South Korea
- Yard number: 1596
- Launched: 19 August 2005
- Christened: 23 November 2005
- Completed: 2005
- Identification: IMO number: 9295256; MMSI number: 211776000; Callsign: DCP12
- Status: In Service

General characteristics
- Class & type: Colombo Express Class container ship
- Tonnage: 93,750 GT 103,800 DWT
- Length: 335.07 m
- Beam: 42.87 m
- Draught: 14.61 m
- Depth: 24.61 m
- Installed power: 68,640kW (93,323hp)
- Propulsion: 12 cylinder, 2 stroke B&W 12K98ME driving a single screw
- Speed: 24.5kn
- Capacity: 8749 TEU
- Crew: 24 crew

Kyoto Express is a container ship of the Colombo Express class of ships owned and operated by Hapag-Lloyd AG. Registered in Monrovia, Liberia, the vessel has been in operation since 2005.

== Hull and engine ==
Built by Hyundai Heavy Industries in Ulsan, South Korea, the Kyoto Express was completed in November 2005. The ship is fully cellular, has nine holds, and has a cargo capacity of 8749 TEU. The ship is 335.07 meters in length, 42.87 meters across the beam, and draws a draught of 14.61 meters.

The ship features a main propulsion plant of a B&W 12K98ME that generates 93,323 hp. The main engine drives a single, fixed-pitch screw, capable of propelling the vessel at a speed of 24.5 knots.

== Crane collapses at docks ==
On January 18, 2008 at approximately 4:35pm, a crane collapsed onto the Kyoto Express at the Southampton Container Terminals. The part of the dock was evacuated, and there were no reported injuries.

Even after four weeks from the crane incident, many ships and vessels had to reroute to other ports due to the dock's suspended operations for rebuilding and repairing. The Kyoto Express's departure was delayed for about 10 days while debris and damaged containers from the collapse were cleared from the ship and dock.

Due to the incident, Honda lost total production at its South Marston factory because the parts could not be delivered, and the 5,000 staff members were sent home. The Kyoto Express was carrying gearboxes and transmissions for Swindon from the Far East that were eventually rerouted to Amsterdam which had to be then transported on land to the United Kingdom.

"This crane failure at Southampton at the weekend has caused us a major problem with the unloading of key engine components," said Julie Cameron, head of corporate communications at Honda. "As a result the car production was disrupted due to this parts shortage. Arrangements have been made to transport the outstanding parts, by road, back to the UK. We are expecting delivery this morning, when full production is estimated to restart on both lines. During this non-production time, associates are being given an opportunity to take holidays and other activities such as training are planned."

The projected loss of production was between 600 and 1,000 vehicles.
