= NYK Virgo =

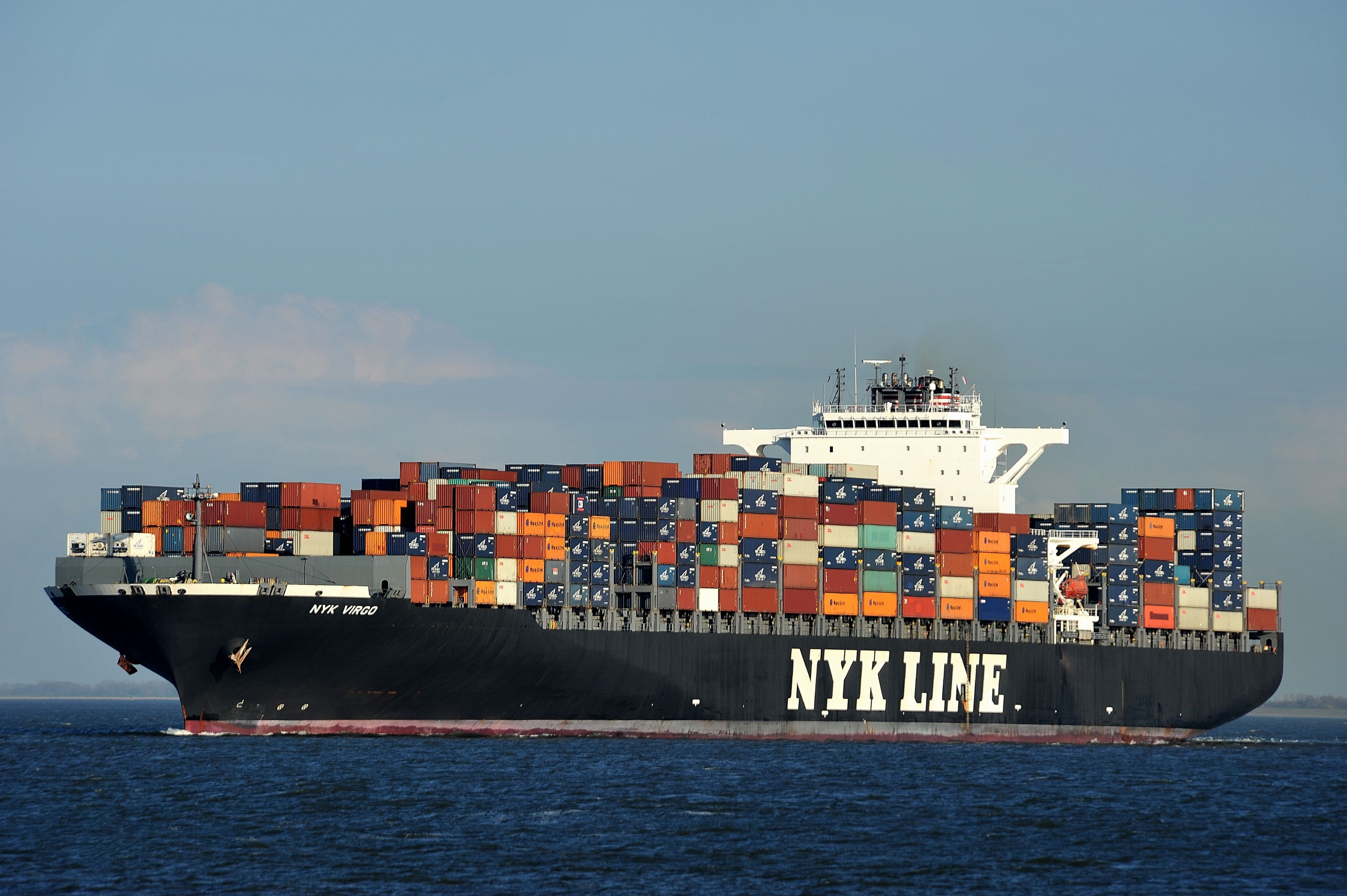

History
- Name: NYK Virgo
- Owner: Barlett Marine Corp
- Operator: NYK Shipmanagement Pte Ltd
- Port of registry: Panama, Panama
- Builder: Hyundai Heavy Industries Co., Ltd.
- Yard number: 1717
- Launched: 16 March 2007
- Completed: 2007
- Identification: IMO number: 9312810; Callsign: 3EKK2; Official number: 3268907; MMSI number: 372744000
- Status: In service

General characteristics
- Class & type: NK
- Tonnage: 97,825
- Length: 338.17
- Draft: 14.524
- Depth: 20.14
- Decks: 1
- Installed power: 64,033KW
- Propulsion: B&W 12 Cy.980X2,660
- Speed: 24.5kn

NYK Virgo is a container ship owned by the Barlett Marine Corp.

== Hull and engine ==
NYK Virgo has a Burmeister & Wain single screw 12 cylinder engine, with a top speed of 24 knots. It was built in Korea by Hyundai Heavy Industries in port number 1717 during 2007.

It is operated by NYK Shipmanagement Pte Ltd. The power this ship has is 64,033 kilowatts and it weighs about 97,825 tons.

== BBC box ==
In 2009 NYK Virgo delivered the BBC Box back to the United Kingdom. The BBC Box was part of a news report on "globalisation and the world economy" and was sent around the world with a GPS tracker. The box carried various cargoes from Scotch whisky to cat food. The journey lasted a year and covered over 50,000 miles.
