= Savannah Express =

German container ship

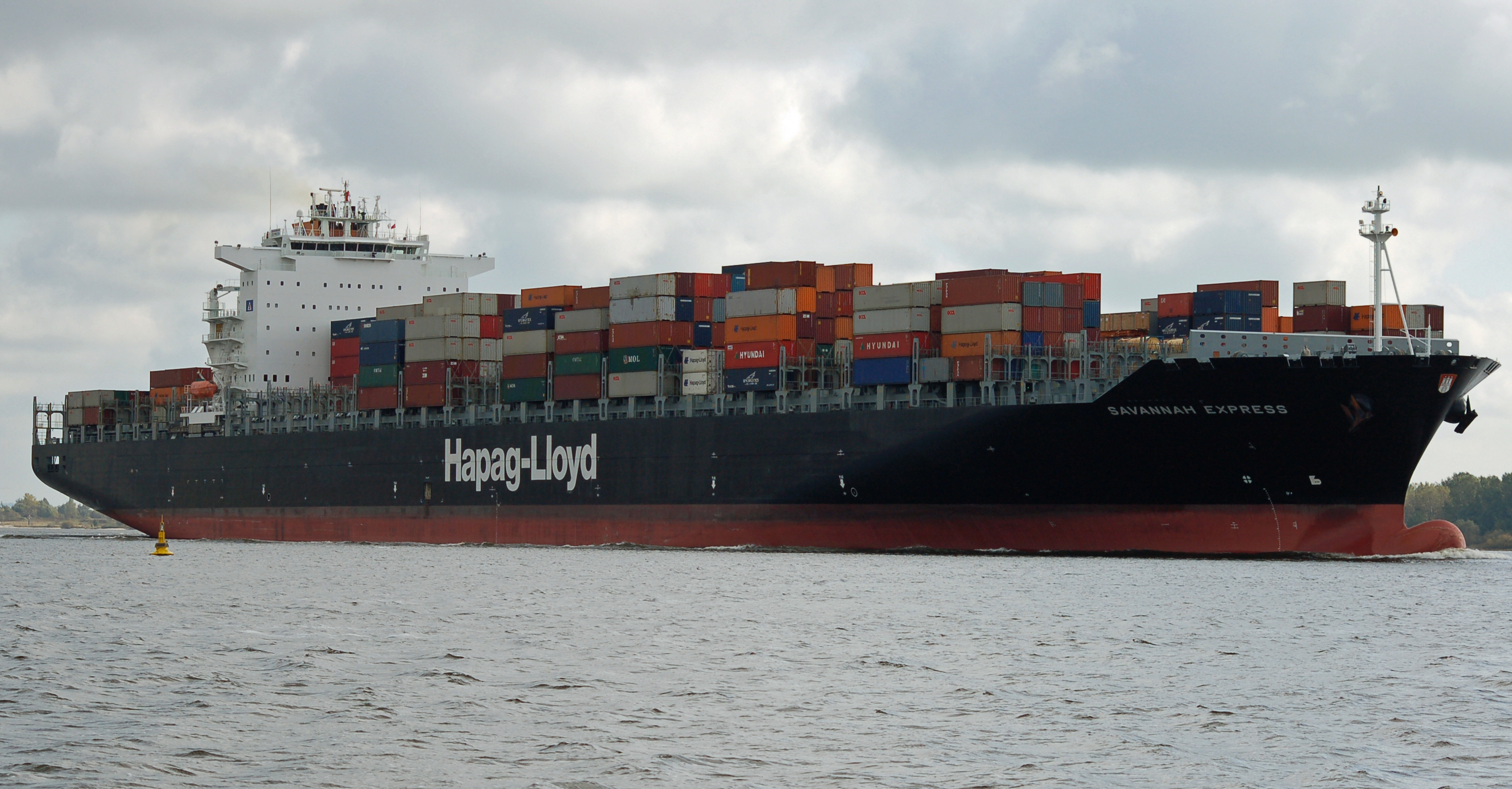

History
- Owner: Norddeutsche Reederei H. Schuldt
- Launched: 31 December 2004
- Completed: 2005
- Identification: IMO number: 9294989; MMSI number: 211693000; Callsign: DNDD

General characteristics
- Type: Container ship
- Tonnage: 107,000 DWT
- Length: 332 m (1,089 ft)
- Beam: 43.2 m (142 ft)
- Installed power: 68,520 kW (91,890 hp)
- Speed: 25 knots (46 km/h; 29 mph)
- Capacity: 8401 TEUs

Savannah Express, is a container ship owned by the Norddeutsche Reederei H. Schuldt company out of Hamburg, Germany. She was completed in 2005. The ship is capable of transporting up to 8401 TEUs at any one time, making her at that time one of the largest container ships in the world. The deadweight tonnage (DWT) is 107,000 metric tons and the maximum speed of this ship is 25 knots (46 km/h; 29 mph). The ship is 332 metres (1,089 ft) long and has a beam (or width) of 43.2 metres (142 ft). The engines are capable of outputting 68,520 kilowatts of power.

Savannah Express is on long term time charter to the Hapag-Lloyd container line, and is on a 42-day liner run between the US and Canadian West Coast and the Far East.

As of 2020, IMO 9294989 is named Northern Julie.
