= NYK Vega =

Container ship built in 2006

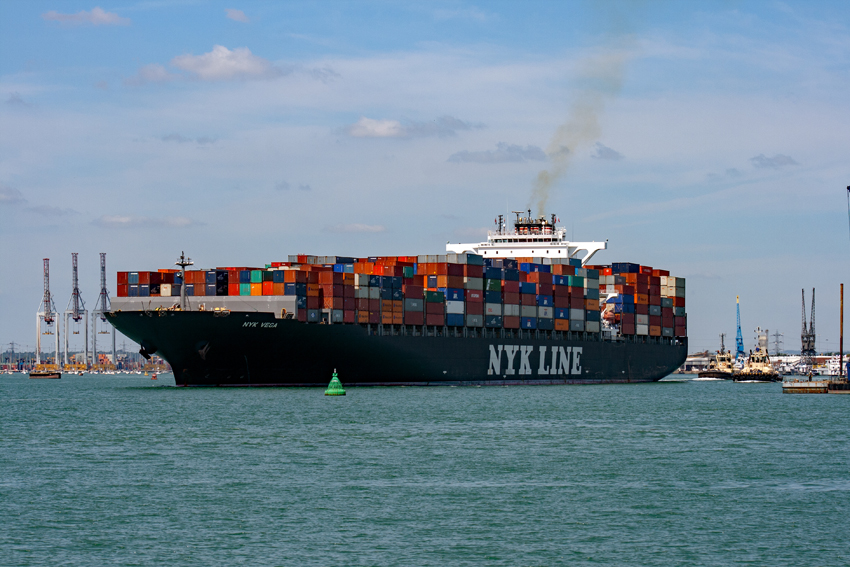
- NYK Vega container ship departing Southampton, 2015

History
- Name: NYK Vega
- Operator: Nippon Yusen Ship Management
- Port of registry: Panama
- Launched: 2006
- Identification: Call sign: 3EIJ5; IMO number: 9312781; MMSI number: 311697000
- Status: Operational

General characteristics
- Type: Container ship
- Tonnage: 97,825 GT; 94,000 DWT
- Length: 338.2 m (1,110 ft)
- Beam: 44 m (144 ft)
- Draught: 14.5 m (48 ft)
- Propulsion: MAN B&W 12K98MC engines; 87,060 hp
- Speed: 25 knots (46 km/h) (maximum); 24.6 knots (46 km/h) (cruising)
- Capacity: 8,600 containers (company statistics); 9,012 TEU (IMO calculations)

NYK Vega is a container ship, operated by Nippon Yusen Ship Management. The vessel has a capacity of 8,600 containers in company calculations and 9,012 TEU in International Maritime Organization calculations. The difference comes from the use of a different method of stowing in checking the ship's stability.

== Design ==
NYK Vega was built in 2006 by Hyundai Heavy Industries, when it was one of the largest and most modern container carriers of the world shipping, at 338.2 m (1,110 ft) long, 44 m (144 ft) wide and a fully loaded draft of 14.5 m (48 ft). The deadweight tonnage of NYK Vega is about 94,000 metric tons and the gross tonnage of the ship is 97,825. She has a maximum speed of 25 knots (46 km/h) and a cruising speed of 24.6 knots (46 km/h). NYK Vega is powered by MAN B&W 12K98MC engines with a power of 87,060 hp (64,920 kW). She sails under the Panamanian flag.

== Bridge equipment ==
Navigation is carried out using two electronic charts which integrate GPS, dGPS, AIS and ARPA, which usually allows the position of the ship to be plotted with an accuracy of 100 meters. NYK Vega’s computers also assist in the efficient loading and unloading of the cargo and containers.
