= Cellular vessel =

A cellular vessel is a container ship specially designed for the efficient storage of freight containers one on top of other with vertical bracings at the four corners. The majority of vessels operated by maritime carriers are fully cellular ships.

Before 1991 most container ships were constructed with hatch covers. Because of the longer loading and unloading times of these types of ships, the cellular type was invented. As loading and unloading occurs only vertically and the containers have standardized dimensions (TEU), large quantities of cargo can quickly be loaded using gantry cranes.

Advantages:

- The cargo handling is more efficient resulting in shorter time in port
- Guide rails hold the containers into place instead of time-consuming lashings
- No need of hatch covers, reducing maintenance, weight, and handling
- There is a high freeboard, resulting in a stronger construction
- Containers lashed to cellular vessels are less vulnerable to crew tampering than containers on mixed-use cargo vessels, making them less of a risk from the standpoint of port security.

Disadvantages:

- The high freeboard results in higher registered tonnage
- The price of the ship is high due to the amount of steel used and the complex design process
- The absence of hatch covers means that rain water and overcoming seawater can freely enter into the cargo hold. Therefore, higher requirements of bilge systems are applicable to open cargo holds
