= List of ship launches in 2015 =

The list of ship launches in 2015 includes a chronological list of ships launched in 2015.

Date	Ship	Class / type	Builder	Location	Country	Notes
5 January	Viking Astrild	River cruise ship	Neptun Werft	Warnemünde	Germany	For Viking River Cruises
10 January	MSC Oliver	Olympic-class container ship	Daewoo Shipbuilding & Marine Engineering		South Korea	For Mediterranean Shipping Company
16 January	Marchen Maersk	Maersk Triple E class	Daewoo	Geoje	South Korea	For Maersk Line
16 January	Mette Maersk	Maersk Triple E class	Daewoo	Geoje	South Korea	For Maersk Line
27 January	Atlantic Star	ACL G4 ConRO ship	Hudong-Zhonghua Shipbuilding	Shanghai	China	For Atlantic Container Line
31 January	Viking Mimir	Viking Longships-clall river cruise ship	Neptun Werft	Rostock-Warnemünde	Germany	For Viking Cruises
2 February	Lady Ami	Sea-River Liner 3700 coastal ship	GS Yard	Waterhuizen	Netherlands	For Wijnne Barends
14 February	Esnaad 221		Shipyard De Hoop	Foxhol	Netherlands	For Abu Dhabi National Oil Company
14 February	Lady Adele	Sea River Liner 3700 coastal ship	GS Yard	Groningen-Waterhuizen	Netherlands	For Wijnne Barends
20 February	Rolldock Sky	S-class Heavy lift ship	Larsen & Toubro	Hazira	India	For Rolldock
21 February	Anthem of the Seas	Quantum-class cruise ship	Meyer Werft	Papenburg, Germany	Germany	For Royal Caribbean International
21 February	Nordana Sky	Ferus Smit Ecobox	Ferus Smit	Leer	Germany	For Symphony Shipping BV
21 February	Viking Vili	Viking Longships-clall river cruise ship	Neptun Werft	Rostock-Warnemünde	Germany	For Viking Cruises
25 February	Gabrielle Giffords	Independence-class littoral combat ship	Austal USA	Mobile, Alabama	United States	For United States Navy
26 February	Barzan	UASC A19-class container ship	Hyundai Samho Heavy Industries	Samho	South Korea	For United Arab Shipping Company
27 February	Linah	UASC A15-class container ship	Hyundai Heavy Industries	Ulsan	South Korea	For United Arab Shipping Company
5 March	Henrich Wuppesahl	9,5/10,5-meter-class Lifeboat (rescue)	Tamsen Maritim	Rostock	Germany	For DGzRS
6 March	Koningsdam	Pinnacle-class cruise ship	Fincantieri		Italy	For Holland America Line
19 March	Maestro Diamond	bulk carrier	Saiki Heavy Industries			For Maestro Shipping
20 March	Arklow Breeze		Ferus Smit	Westerbroek	Netherlands	
25 March	Murmansk	Icebreaker	Arctech Helsinki Shipyard	Helsinki, Finland	Finland	For Rosmorport
27 March	Marit Maersk	Maersk Triple E class	Daewoo	Geoje	South Korea	For Maersk Line
28 March	John Finn	Arleigh Burke-class destroyer	Ingalls Shipbuilding	Pascagoula, Mississippi	United States	For United States Navy
28 March	Viking Vilhjalm	Viking Longships-clall river cruise ship	Neptun Werft	Rostock-Warnemünde	Germany	For Viking Cruises
6 April	INS Kalvari	Scorpène-class submarine	Mazagon Dock Ltd.	Mumbai	India	For Indian Navy
9 April	Nordrhein-Westfalen	F125-class frigate	Lürssen	Bremen	Germany	For German Navy
11 April	Mathilde Maersk	Maersk Triple E class	Daewoo	Geoje	South Korea	For Maersk Line
11 April	MSC Zoe	Olympic-class container ship	Daewoo		South Korea	For Mediterranean Shipping Company
14 April	Ernst Meier-Hedde	28-meter-class lifeboat	Fassmer	Bern	Germany	For DGzRS
17 April	Triton		Royal Bodewes	Hoogezand	Netherlands	for Rederij Tasman
18 April	Taransay	Luxury yacht	Rossinavi	Viareggio	Italy	
25 April	Project Jupiter	Yacht	Lürssen	Bremen	Germany	
25 April	Viking Kadlin	Viking Longships-class river cruise ship	Neptun Werft	Rostock-Warnemünde	Germany	For Viking Cruises
30 April	Project Orchid	Yacht	Lürssen	Bremen	Germany	
30 April	hull number 6501	Yacht casco	Flensburger Schiffbau Gesellschaft	Flensburg	Germany	completed at Abeking & Rasmussen, Lemwerder
2 May	Lady Ami	Sea River Liner	GS Yard	Groningen-Waterhuizen	Netherlands	For Wijnne Barends
19 May	Brunswick	Spearhead-class joint high speed vessel	Austal USA	Mobile, Alabama	United States	For United States Navy
22 May	Viking Rolf	Viking Longships-class river cruise ship	Neptun Werft	Rostock-Warnemünde	Germany	For Viking Cruises
23 May	MSC Maya	Olympic-class container ship	Daewoo		South Korea	For Mediterranean Shipping Company
23 May	Hobart	Hobart-class destroyer			Australia	For Royal Australian Navy
31 May	Al Muraykh	UASC A19-class container ship	Hyundai Samho Heavy Industries	Samho	South Korea	For United Arab Shipping Company
2 June	Ślązak	Gawron-class corvette	Stocznia Marynarki Wojennej	Gdynia	Poland	For Polish Navy
6 June	Viking Tialfi	Viking Longships-class river cruise ship	Neptun Werft	Rostock-Warnemünde	Germany	For Viking Cruises
15 June	Atlantic Sail	ACL G4 ConRO ship	Hudong-Zhonghua Shipbuilding	Shanghai	China	For Atlantic Container Line
18 June	Ramform Tethys	Ramform Titan-class research vessel	Mitsubishi Heavy Ind., Ltd.	Nagasaki	Japan	
19 June	Harmony of the Seas	Oasis-class cruise ship	STX France	Saint Nazaire, France	France	For Royal Caribbean International
25 June	Carnival Vista	Vista-class cruise ship	Fincantieri	Monfalcone, Italy	Italy	For Carnival Cruise Lines
25 June	Viking Sea	Venice-class cruise ship	Fincantieri	Ancona, Italy	Italy	For Viking Ocean Cruises
3 July	Nordana Star	Ferus Smit Ecobox	Ferus Smit	Leer	Germany	For Symphony Shipping BV
4 July	Romeo Romei	Type 212 submarine	Fincantieri	Muggiano	Italy	For Italian Navy
4 July	Esnaad 222		Shipyard De Hoop	Foxhol	Netherlands	For Abu Dhabi National Oil Company
16 July	Al Nasriyah	UASC A15-class container ship	Hyundai Samho Heavy Industries	Samho	South Korea	For United Arab Shipping Company
18 July	Little Rock	Freedom-class littoral combat ship	Marinette Marine	Marinette, Wisconsin	United States	For United States Navy
July	Independence	Littoral Mission Vessel	Singapore Technologies Marine	Singapore	Singapore	For Republic of Singapore Navy
15 August	Norwegian Escape	Breakaway-Plus-class cruise ship	Meyer Werft	Papenburg	Germany	For Norwegian Cruise Line
15 August	MSC Sveva	Olympic-class container ship	Daewoo		South Korea	For Mediterranean Shipping Company
21 August	MSC Clara	Olympic-class container ship	Daewoo Shipbuilding & Marine Engineering		South Korea	For Mediterranean Shipping Company
22 August	Lady Ariane	Sea River Liner 3700 coastal ship	GS Yard	Waterhuizen	Netherlands	For Wijnne Barends
28 August	Orgullo Petrolero		Navantia	Ferrol, Galicia	Spain	For Pemex
28 August	Sundowner		Shipyard Constructions Hoogezand Nieuwbouw BV	Hoogezand	Netherlands	
28 August	Viking Egil	Viking Longships-class river cruise ship	Neptun Werft	Rostock-Warnemünde	Germany	For Viking Cruises
2 September	Auvergne	FREMM multipurpose frigate	DCNS		France	For French Navy
5 September	Al Nefud	UASC A19-class container ship	Hyundai Heavy Industries	Ulsan	South Korea	For United Arab Shipping Company
5 September	Al Zubara	UASC A19-class container ship	Hyundai Samho Heavy Industries	Samho	South Korea	For United Arab Shipping Company
8 August	Illinois	Virginia-class submarine	General Dynamics Electric Boat	Groton	United States	For United States Navy
9 September	Lone Star State	ECO-class tanker	General Dynamics NASSCO		United States	For American Petroleum Tankers
10 September	Atlantic Sea	ACL G4 ConRO ship	Hudong-Zhonghua Shipbuilding	Shanghai	China	For Atlantic Container Line
12 September	Munro	Legend-class cutter	Huntington Ingalls Industries Ingalls	Pascagoula, Mississippi	United States	For United States Coast Guard
18 September	Arklow Vale	5100 DWAT Bodewes Traders	Royal Bodewes	Hoogezand	Netherlands	For Arklow Shipping
29 September	Reforma Pemex		Barreras de Vigo	Vigo	Spain	For Pemex
30 September	Helix 1	Well Intervention vessel	FSG	Flensburg	Germany	For Siem Offshore
1 October	Archelle		GS Yard	Waterhuizen	Netherlands	
14 October	Lady Ariette	Sea River Liner 3700 coastal ship	GS Yard	Waterhuizen	Netherlands	For Wijnne Barends
16 October	Al Dahna	UASC A19-class container ship	Hyundai Samho Heavy Industries	Ulsan	South Korea	For United Arab Shipping Company
30 October	Seven Seas Explorer	Cruise ship	Fincantieri	Sestri Ponente	Italy	for Regent Seven Seas Cruises
31 October	Esnaad 224		DeHoop	Foxhol	Netherlands	For Abu Dhabi National Oil Company
31 October	Greenland	Cement carrier	Ferus Smit	Westerbroek	Netherlands	For JT cement
31 October	Al Dhail	UASC A15-class container ship	Hyundai Samho Heavy Industries	Samho	South Korea	For United Arab Shipping Company
19 November	Itarus	Semi-submersible platform	Fincantieri	La Spezia	Italy	For RosRAO
20 November	Omaha	Independence-class littoral combat ship	Austal USA	Mobile, Alabama	United States	For United States Navy
23 November	James Joyce	Samuel Beckett-class offshore patrol vessel	Babcock Marine Ltd.	Appledore	United Kingdom	For Irish Naval Service.
25 November	Esnaad 223		Shipyard De Hoop	Lobith	Netherlands	For Abu Dhabi National Oil Company
27 November	Atlantic Sky	ACL G4 ConRO ship	Hudong-Zhonghua Shipbuilding	Shanghai	China	For Atlantic Container Line
27 November	Al Dahna	UASC A19-class container ship	Hyundai Samho Heavy Industries	Ulsan	South Korea	For United Arab Shipping Company
1 December	Bigroll Bering		COSCO (Dalian) Shipyard Co.	Dalian	China	For RollDock Shipping B.V.
10 December	S 41	Type 209 submarine	ThyssenKrupp Marine Systems	Kiel	Germany	For Egyptian Navy
11 December	Nordana Sea	Ferus Smit Ecobox	Ferus Smit	Leer	Germany	For Symphony Shipping BV
12 December	Al Mashrab	UASC A15-class container ship	Hyundai Samho Heavy Industries	Samho	South Korea	For United Arab Shipping Company
12 December	Independence	ECO-class tanker	General Dynamics NASSCO		United States	For SEA-Vista
16 December	Windea La Cour	Service operations vessel	Crist yard	Gdynia	Poland	For Bernhard Schulte Offshore
17 December	Arklow View	5100 DWAT Bodewes Traders	Royal Bodewes	Hoogezand	Netherlands	For Arklow Shipping
18 December	La Confiance	Patrol Boat	Socarenam	Saint Malo	France	For French Navy
19 December	Alpino	FREMM multipurpose frigate	Fincantieri	Riva Trigoso	Italy	For Italian Navy
31 December	Triton	Triton-class container ship	Samsung Heavy Industries	Koje	South Korea	For Costamare Shipping Company
Unknown date	Dalby Don	Crew transfer vessel	Alicat Workboats Ltd.	Great Yarmouth	United Kingdom	For Dalby Offshore Services Ltd.
Unknown date	Tempest	Crew transfer vessel	Aluminium Marine Consultants Ltd.	Cowes	United Kingdom	For private owner.
Unknown date	Yu Gwan-sun	Type 214 submarine	Daewoo		South Korea	For Republic of Korea Navy
