= A13-class container ship =

Ship class

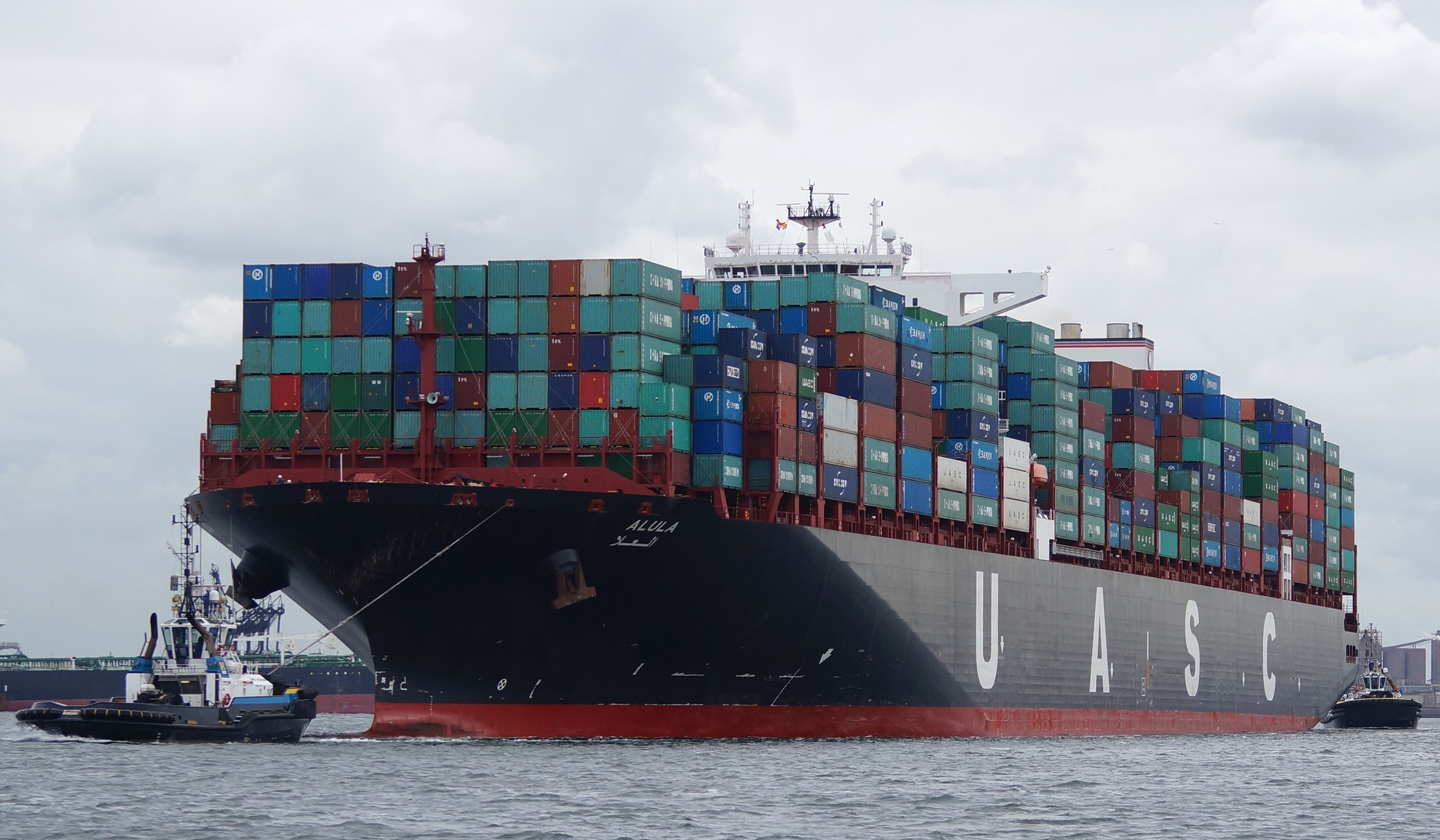
- Alula in the port of Rotterdam

Class overview
- Builders: Samsung Heavy Industries
- Operators: Hapag-Lloyd
- In service: 2011-present
- Planned: 9
- Building: 0
- Completed: 9
- Active: 9

General characteristics
- Type: Container ship
- Tonnage: 141,077 GT
- Length: 366 m (1,201 ft)
- Beam: 48.2 m (158 ft)
- Draught: 15.5 m (51 ft)
- Propulsion: MAN B&W 12K98ME-7
- Capacity: 13,296 TEU

The A13 class is a series of 9 container ships originally built for the United Arab Shipping Company (UASC) and now operated by Hapag-Lloyd. The ships have a maximum theoretical capacity of 13,296 TEU. The ships were built by Samsung Heavy Industries in South Korea.

== List of ships ==
Ship	Yard number	IMO number	Delivery	Status	ref
Umm Salal	1876	9525857	13 Apr 2011	In service	
Ain Snan	1877	9525869	16 Jan 2012	In service	
Unayzah	1878	9525871	8 Feb 2012	In service	
Alula	1879	9525883	22 Feb 2012	In service	
Tayma	1880	9525895	7 Mar 2012	In service	
Malik Al Ashtar	1881	9525900	21 Mar 2012	In service	
Al Riffa	1882	9525912	4 Apr 2012	In service	
Al Qibla	1883	9525924	18 Apr 2012	In service	
Jebel Ali	1884	9525936	2 May 2012	In service	

== See also ==
- A18-class container ship
- A15-class container ship
