= Umm Salal (ship) =

Maltese container ship

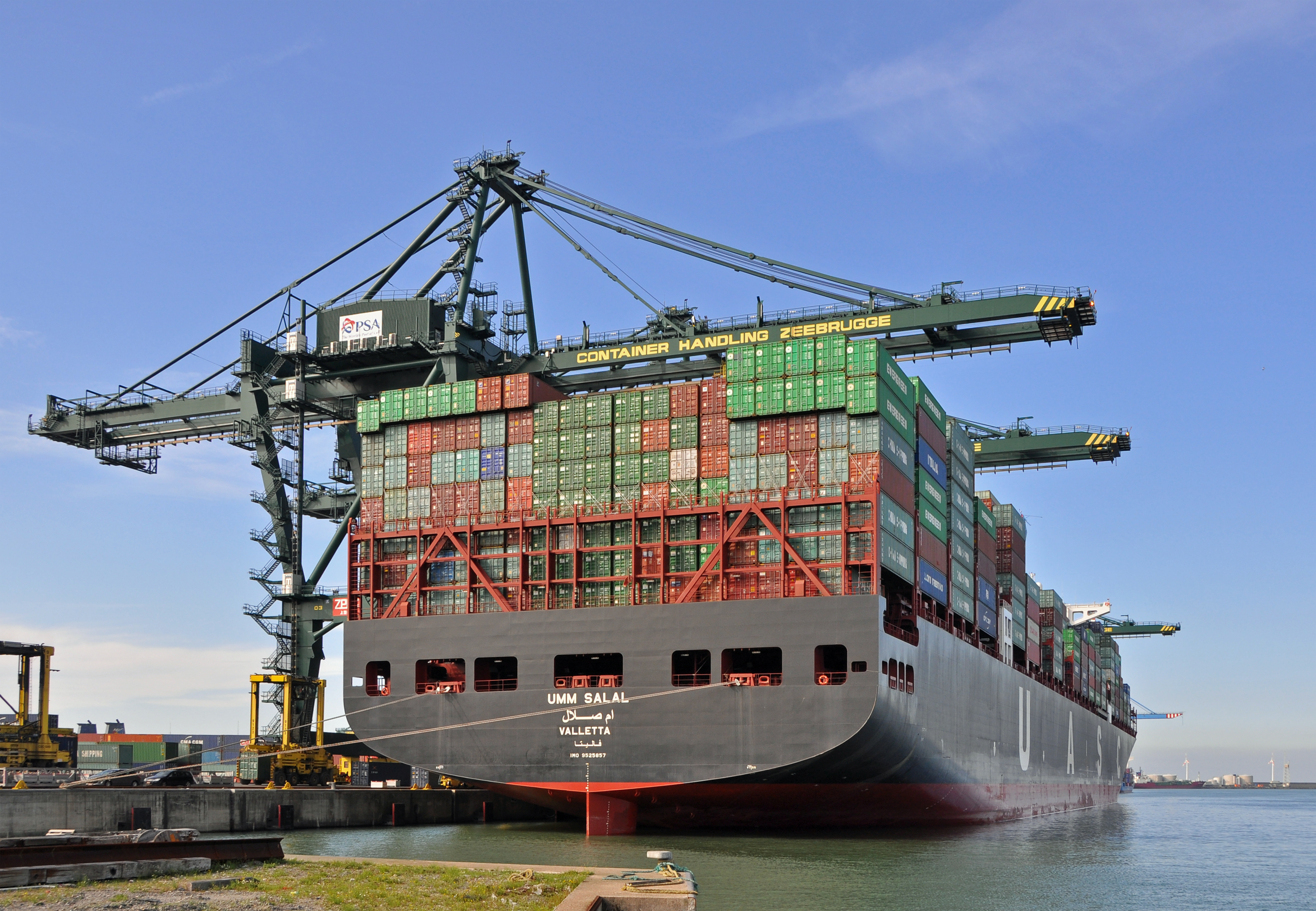

History

Malta
- Name: UMM Salal
- Operator: UASC (Kuwait)
- Port of registry: Valletta
- Ordered: 2010
- Builder: Samsung Heavy Industries
- Launched: 27 November 2011
- Identification: Call sign: 9HA2682; IMO number: 9525857; MMSI number: 215237000
- Status: Operational

General characteristics
- Class & type: A13 class Container ship
- Tonnage: 141,077 GT; 145,327 DWT
- Length: 366 m (1,201 ft)
- Beam: 48 m (157 ft)
- Draft: 15.5 m (51 ft)
- Installed power: 71,760 kW
- Propulsion: MAN B&W 12K98ME-7
- Speed: 26.0 knots (48 km/h) (maximum); 24.0 knots (44 km/h) (cruising)
- Capacity: 13,296 TEU

UMM Salal is a container ship that was built in 2011 by Samsung Heavy Industries in their shipyard in Geoje, South Korea. The vessel is among the largest container ships in the world with capacity to carry 13,296 TEU or 9,600 FEU with 1,000 reefer points. The boxship has eight sister ships, operating in the fleet of UASC.

== Design and engineering ==
The mega container ship UMM Salal has an overall length of 366 m (1,201 ft), beam of 48 m (157 ft) and draft of 15.5 m (51 ft). The deadweight of the boxship is 145,327 DWT and the gross tonnage is 141,077 GT. With such tonnage and dimensions, the vessel has capacity to carry 13,296 TEU or 9,600 FEU.

== Engineering ==
The main engine of the Salal is the MAN B&W 12K98ME-7, a long-stroke and low-revolution engine that has total output power of 71,760 kW.

== Operational service ==
The Salal is deployed in Asia/Gulf Express 1 (AGX1) service of UASC. The service connects North, Central & South China, East Asia and South East Asia to the Persian Gulf and vice versa.

== Accidents ==
On 7 April 2017, the Salal ran aground in the Strait of Malacca shortly after leaving Port Klang, Malaysia. The vessel stuck at the separation scheme at heavy traffic route.

== See also ==
- Largest container shipping companies
