= MV Barzan =

Containership

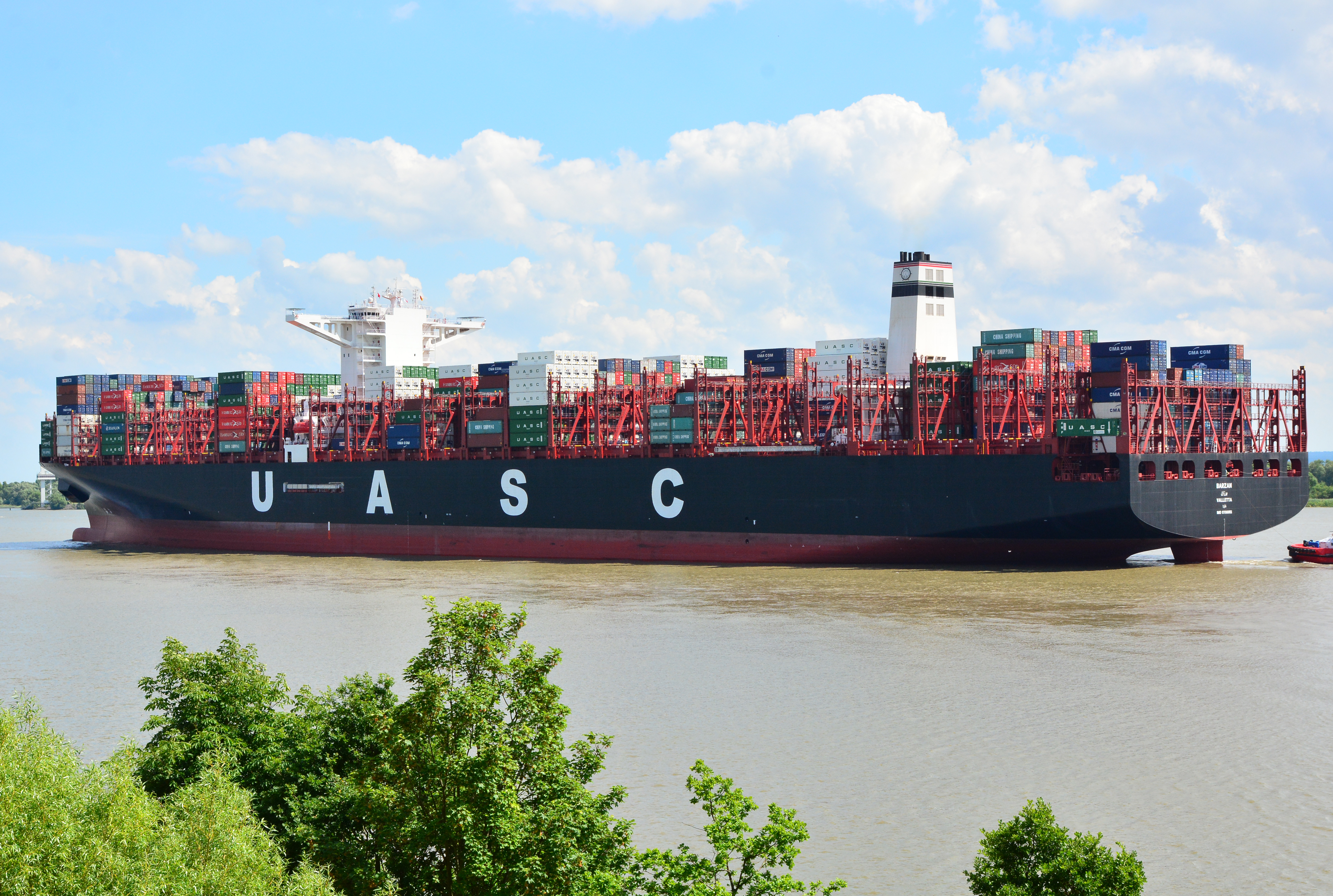
- MV Barzan, as seen on the Elbe

History
- Name: Barzan
- Owner: UASC
- Operator: Hapag-Lloyd
- Port of registry: Malta
- Ordered: 2013
- Builder: Hyundai Samho (Mokpo)
- Yard number: S746
- Launched: 2014
- Christened: 29 April 2015
- Completed: 2015
- Maiden voyage: 08 May 2015
- In service: 2015-Present
- Identification: IMO number: 9708851; MMSI number: 229930000; Callsign: 9HA3727
- Status: Active
- Notes: Class DNV GL

General characteristics
- Class & type: A18-class container ship
- Tonnage: 195,636 GT; 199,714 DWT
- Length: 400 m (1,300 ft)
- Beam: 58.6 m (192 ft)
- Draught: 16 m (52 ft)
- Decks: 10 upper low cargo area
- Speed: 22.8 kn (42.2 km/h; 26.2 mph)
- Capacity: 18,800 TEU
- Crew: 35
- Notes: Call Sign: 9HA3727

Barzan is an ultra-large container ship. It is the first of a series of six 18,800 TEU container ships built in South Korea for United Arab Shipping Company (UASC). As of 2015, it stood among the largest container ships in the world. According to the builder, it has carbon emissions far lower than the Maersk Triple E class container ships.

== Name ==
Barzān (Arabic: برزان "high place"), is the name of towers used for observation in Qatar, which is a shareholding state in UASC. The towers were built more than a century ago by Sheikh Mohammed bin Jassim Al Thani, founder of Umm Salal Mohammed village in Qatar.

== Construction ==
Barzan was built by Hyundai Heavy Industries in Mokpo, South Korea in 2015. She has a deadweight of 199,744 tonnes, and gross tonnage of 195,636. It took the shipyard six months to build her (from steel cutting to launching).

Classed under DNV GL as the first ship ever to have “Gas Ready” class notation, Barzan has, according to the builder, the lowest per-container level of carbon emissions. Her "Energy Efficiency Design Index" is quoted as almost 50% less than the International Maritime Organization limit set for 2025.

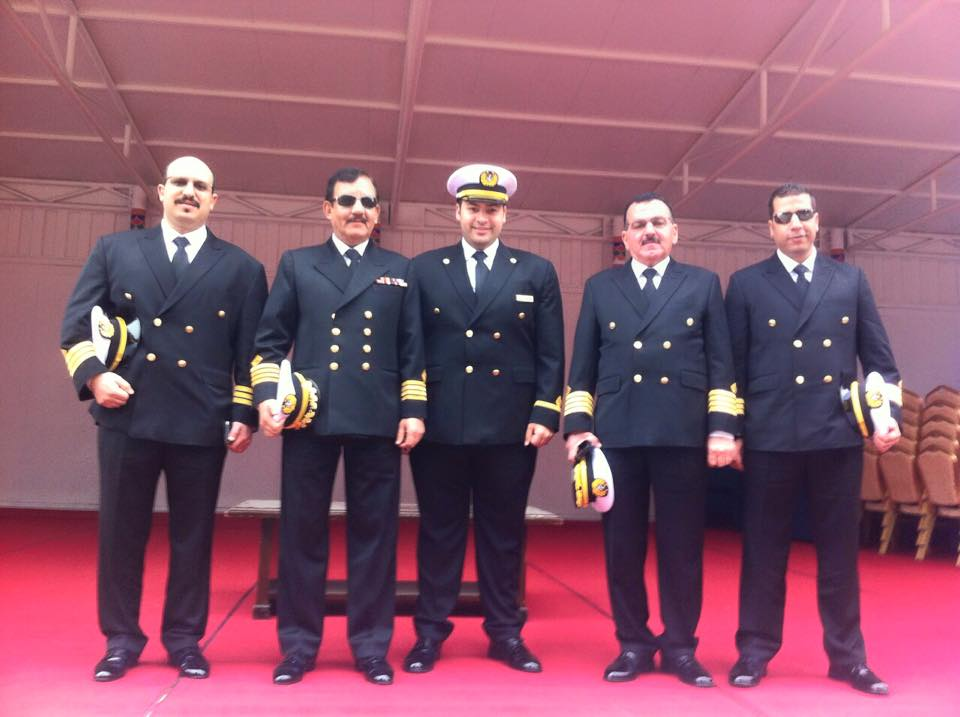
Ship Naming Ceremony in 2015

== Ship and operations ==
Barzan is operated by a multinational crew. As of August 2015, she was placed on the UASC service route of "AEC-1 Asia - Europe container service". This route takes her to the ports of North China (Qingdao), Central China (Shanghai and Ningbo), South China (Yantian), South East Asia (Port Kelang and Singapore), and four North European ports (London Gateway, Hamburg, Rotterdam and Zeebrugge). Barzan is managed by UASC Kuwait and classed with DNV GL.

== See also ==
- Largest container shipping companies
