= Yacht =

Recreational boat or ship

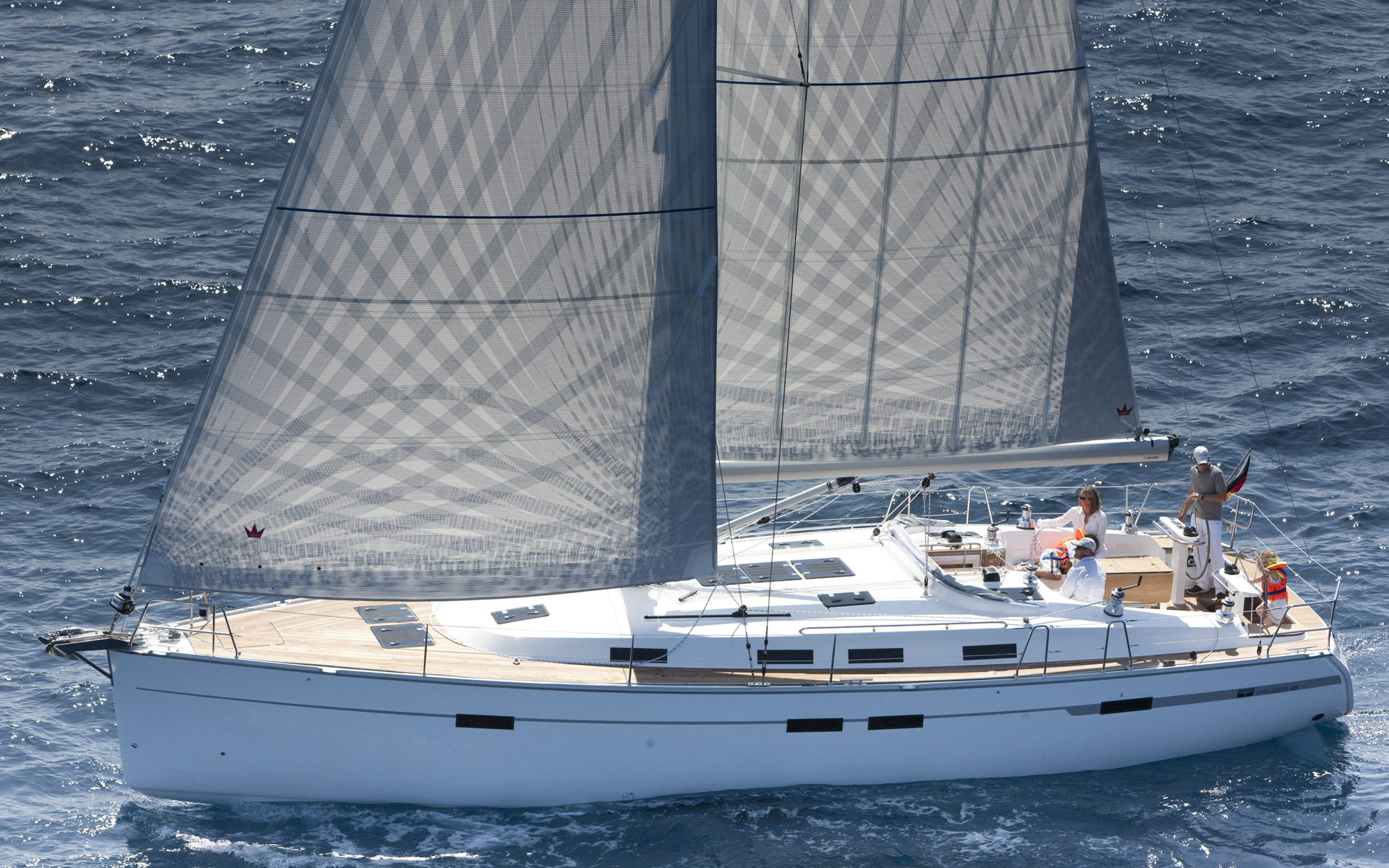
A 45-foot cruising yacht in 2010

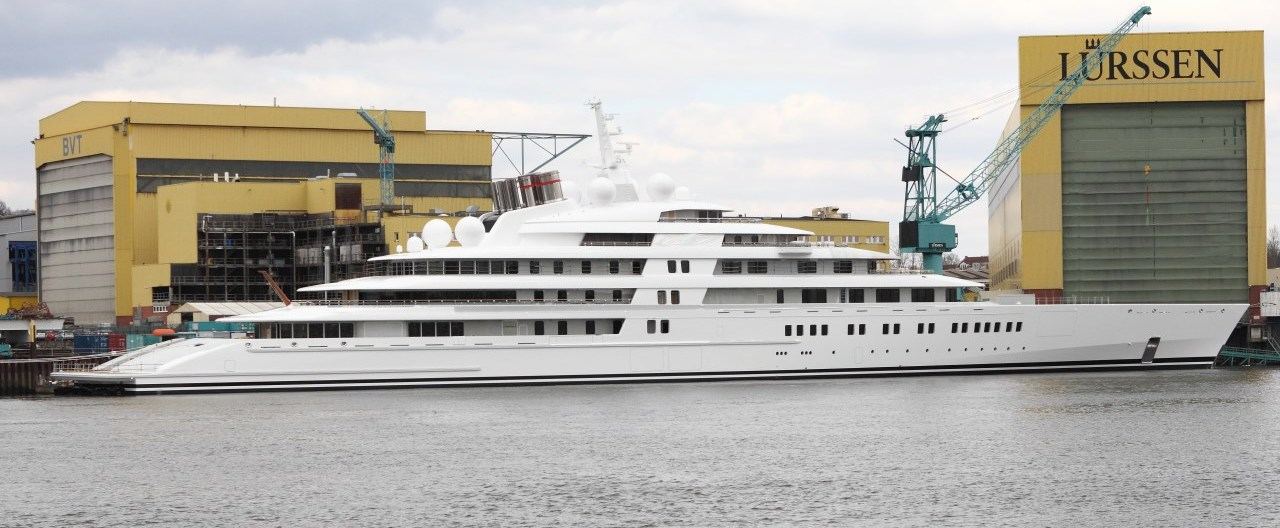
The superyacht Azzam, the longest private yacht, as of 2018.

A yacht (/jɒt/) is a sail- or motor-propelled watercraft made for pleasure, cruising, or racing. There is no standard definition, though the term generally applies to vessels with a cabin intended for overnight use.

The Commercial Yacht Code classifies yachts 79 ft (24 m) and over as large. Such yachts typically require a hired crew and have higher construction standards. Further classifications for large yachts are commercial: carrying no more than 12 passengers; private: solely for the pleasure of the owner and guests, or by flag, the country under which it is registered. A superyacht (sometimes megayacht) generally refers to any yacht (sail or power) longer than 131 ft (40 m).

Racing yachts are designed to emphasize performance over comfort. Charter yachts are run as a business for profit. As of 2020, there were more than 15,000 yachts of sufficient size to require a professional crew.

== Etymology ==
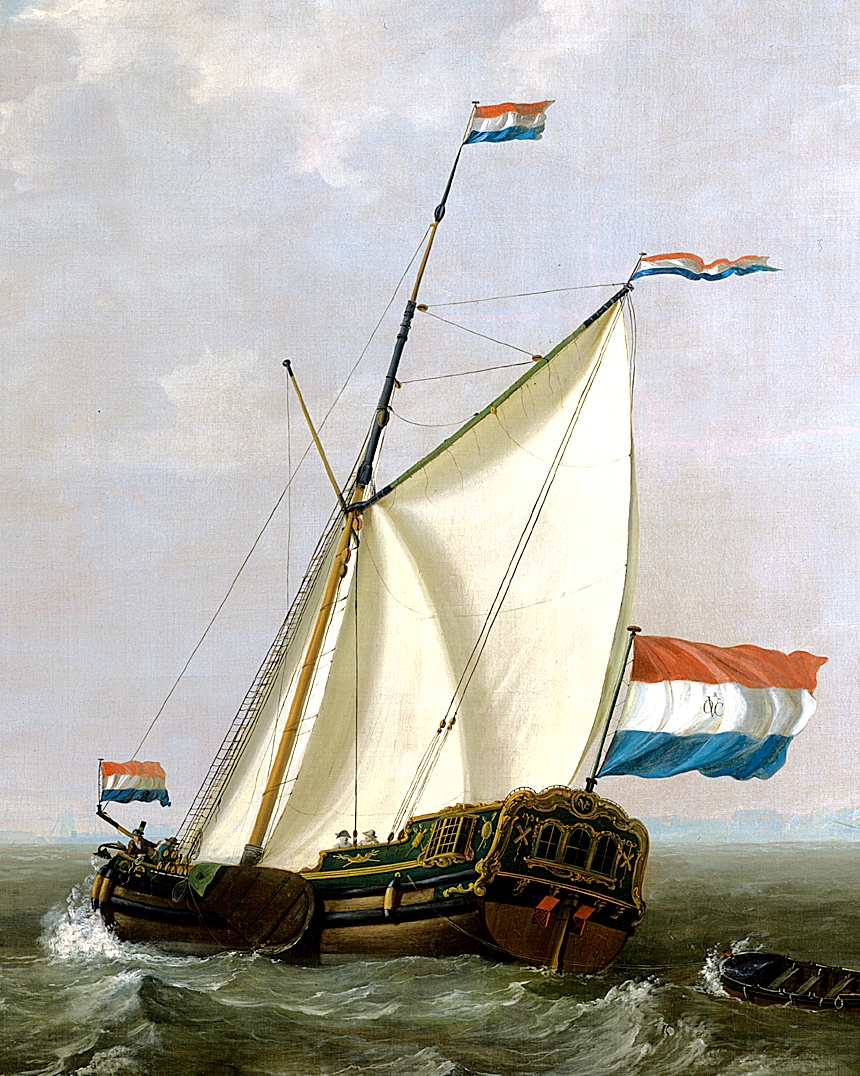
An 18th-century Dutch jacht

The term, yacht, originates from the Dutch word jacht (pl. jachten), which means "hunt", and originally referred to light, fast sailing vessels used by the Dutch Republic navy and the Dutch East India Company. Typically, a jacht would scout ahead of larger vessels in a fleet.

== History ==
The history of pleasure boats begins with rowed craft in Pharaonic Egyptian times, and other vessels in the waters of Myanmar, India, Mindanao and Japan. Anglo-Saxon royal pleg-scips (play ships) of the 8th-century featured ornamented bows and sterns and had the capability of cooking on board.

=== Sail ===
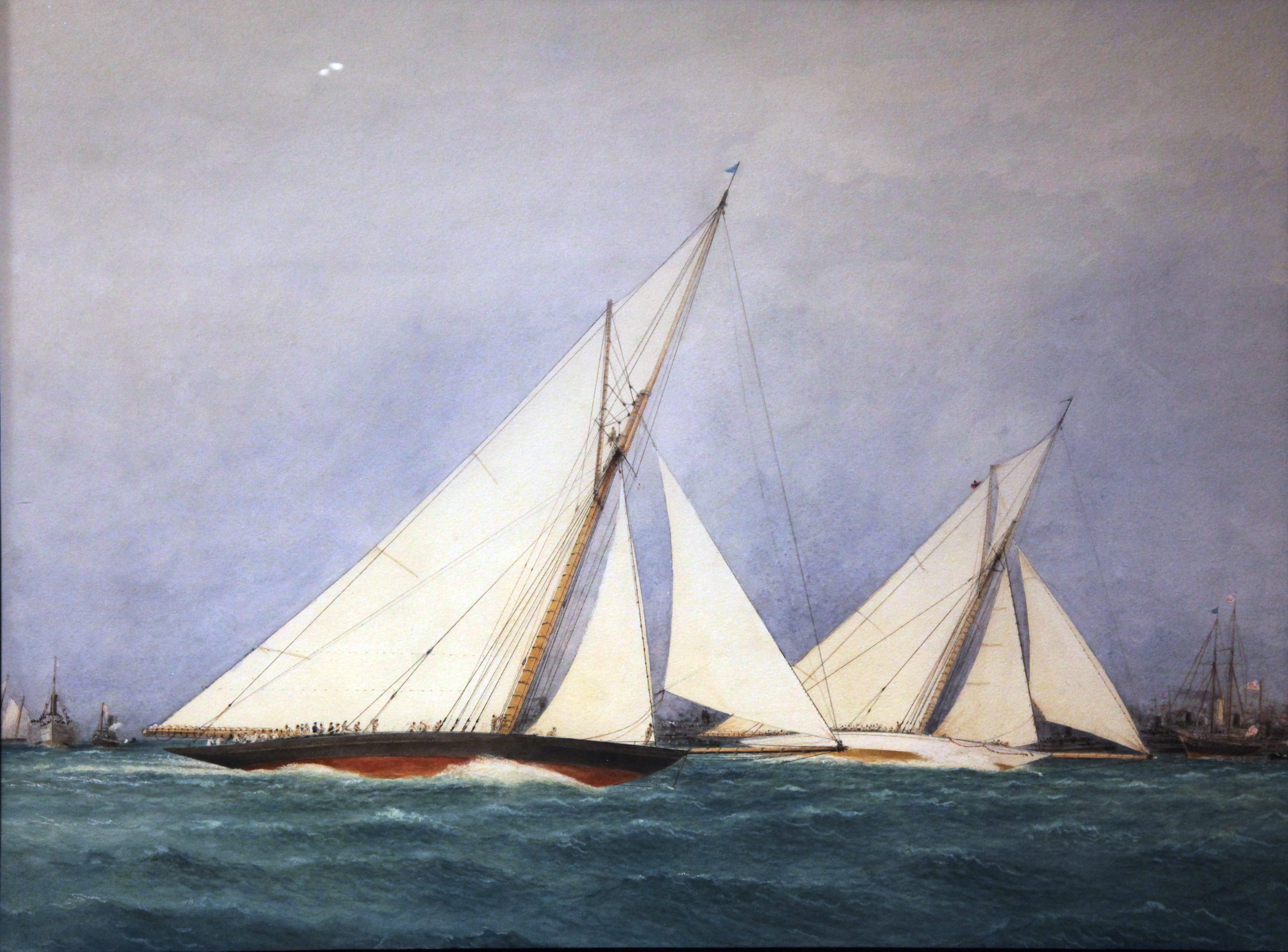
1893 America's Cup match between Vigilant and Valkyrie II

The history of sailing yachts begins in Europe in the beginning of the 1600s with the building of a pleasure vessel for the son of King James I of England. While other monarchs used naval ships for transportation and conquest, James I was the first English monarch to commission the construction of a yacht—for his son Henry, Prince of Wales in the early 1600s. Pleasure vessels acquired the name yacht after the time of Charles II, who spent time exiled in Europe and visited the Netherlands, where a variety of jachten were already well developed as pleasure boats for the elite classes since the beginning of the 17th century. Upon his restoration to the English crown, Charles was presented with a yacht and later commissioned a series of royal yachts, which included at least one experimental catamaran. The first recorded yacht race between two vessels occurred in 1661, followed by the first open sailing competition in 1663 in English waters.

Starting in 1739, England found itself in a series of wars—a period that saw a decline in yachting. In Ireland, however, the gentry enjoyed yachting and founded the first yacht club in Cork as the Cork Harbour Water Club in 1720. English yacht racing continued among the English gentry who founded England's oldest yacht club, the Cumberland Fleet, in 1775. With maritime peace, starting in 1815, came a resurgence of interest in yachting. Boatbuilders, who had been making fast vessels both for smugglers and the government revenue cutters, turned their skills again to yachts.

The fast yachts of the early 19th century were fore-and-aft luggers, schooners, and sloops. By the 1850s, yachts featured large sail areas, a narrow beam, and a deeper draft than was customary until then. Racing between yachts owned by wealthy patrons was common, with large wagers at stake. The America's Cup arose out of a contest between the yacht, America, and its English competitors. Both countries had rules by which to rate yachts, the English by tonnage and the American by length.

In the late 19th century, yacht owners would base their choice of vessel upon preferred lifestyle and budget, which would determine the size and type of vessel, which would most likely be a fore-and aft, two-masted sailing vessel. A treatise on the subject, A Manual of Yacht and Boat Sailing, provided detailed information on selecting, equipping, sailing, seamanship, management of the paid crew, and racing such vessels. It included a brief section on steam yachts, the recirculating coil steam engine just having made such yachts efficient enough for leisure travel on the water.

=== Power ===
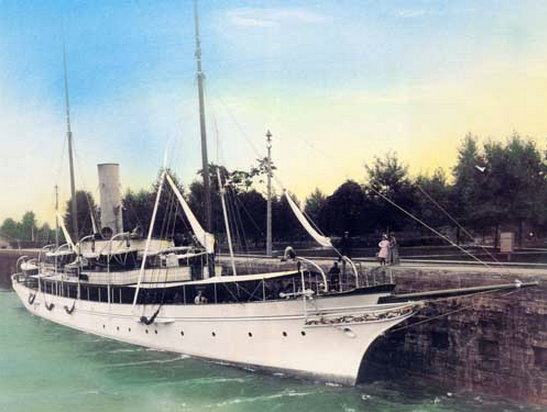
Steam yacht, Gunilda, c. 1910

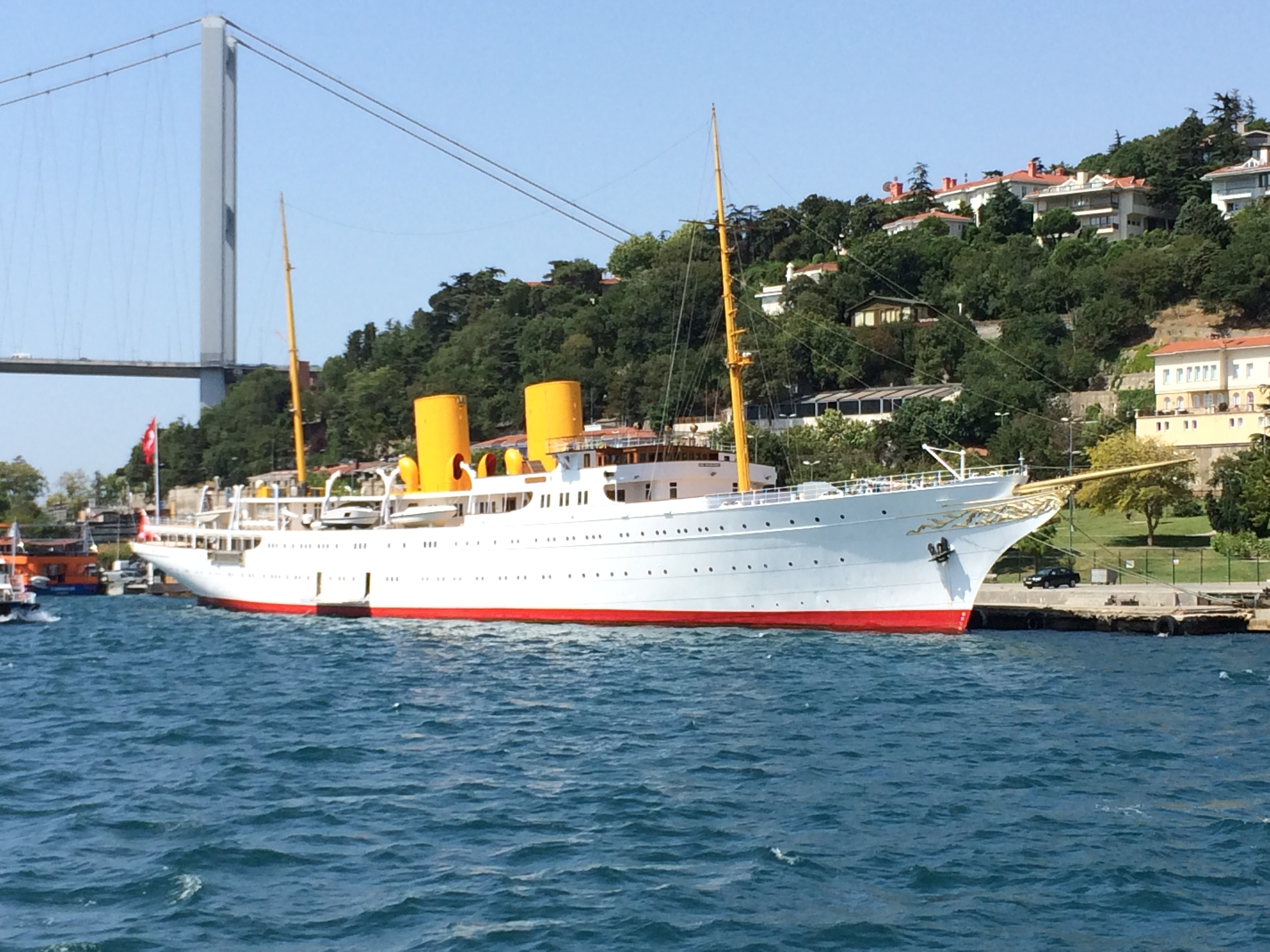
Turkish state yacht, Savarona in 2014, a steam-turbine yacht re-engined with diesels

While sailing yachts continued to exist, the development of reliable power plants created a new category of pleasure craft. The power plants started with the steam engine and transitioned to the internal combustion engine. Whereas sailing yachts continued to be steered from the after portion of the vessel, power yachts adopted the bridge in a forward cabin structure that afforded better forward and sideways visibility.

==== Steam ====
The history of steam yachts starts with large sailing yachts with a steam auxiliary engine. Early examples, driven with paddle wheels, had a railed platform from which the person conning the vessel could walk across the vessel above the main deck, the origin of the bridge. In the late 18th century, steam engines became more efficient, spars were removed and screw propellers became standard. Steam yachts evolved with the development of the steam engine. Ultimately, engines employed pistons driven by steam within cylinders, connected to a crank shaft, which drove a propeller.

Near the end of the 19th century, compound engines came into widespread use. Compound engines exhausted steam into successively larger cylinders to accommodate the higher volumes at reduced pressures, giving improved efficiency. These stages were called expansions, with double- and triple-expansion engines being common, especially in shipping where efficiency was important to reduce the weight of coal carried. Steam engines remained the dominant source of power until the early 20th century, when advances in the design of the steam turbine, electric motors and internal combustion engines gradually resulted in the replacement of reciprocating (piston) steam engines.

Large steam yachts were luxurious; their staff included a captain, engineer, and stewards, as well as deck hands.

==== Internal combustion ====
Nicolaus Otto and Gottlieb Daimler developed practical four-stroke gasoline engines, starting in 1876. Beginning in 1898 engines increased in horsepower from 25 horsepower (19 kW) to 500 brake horsepower (370 kW) by 1906. Some were destined for speedboats, other for motor yachts. Diesel power plants for boats were demonstrated in 1903. Diesels became a more prevalent type of power plant in the 20th century thanks to their low cost of operation and reliability.

== Classification ==
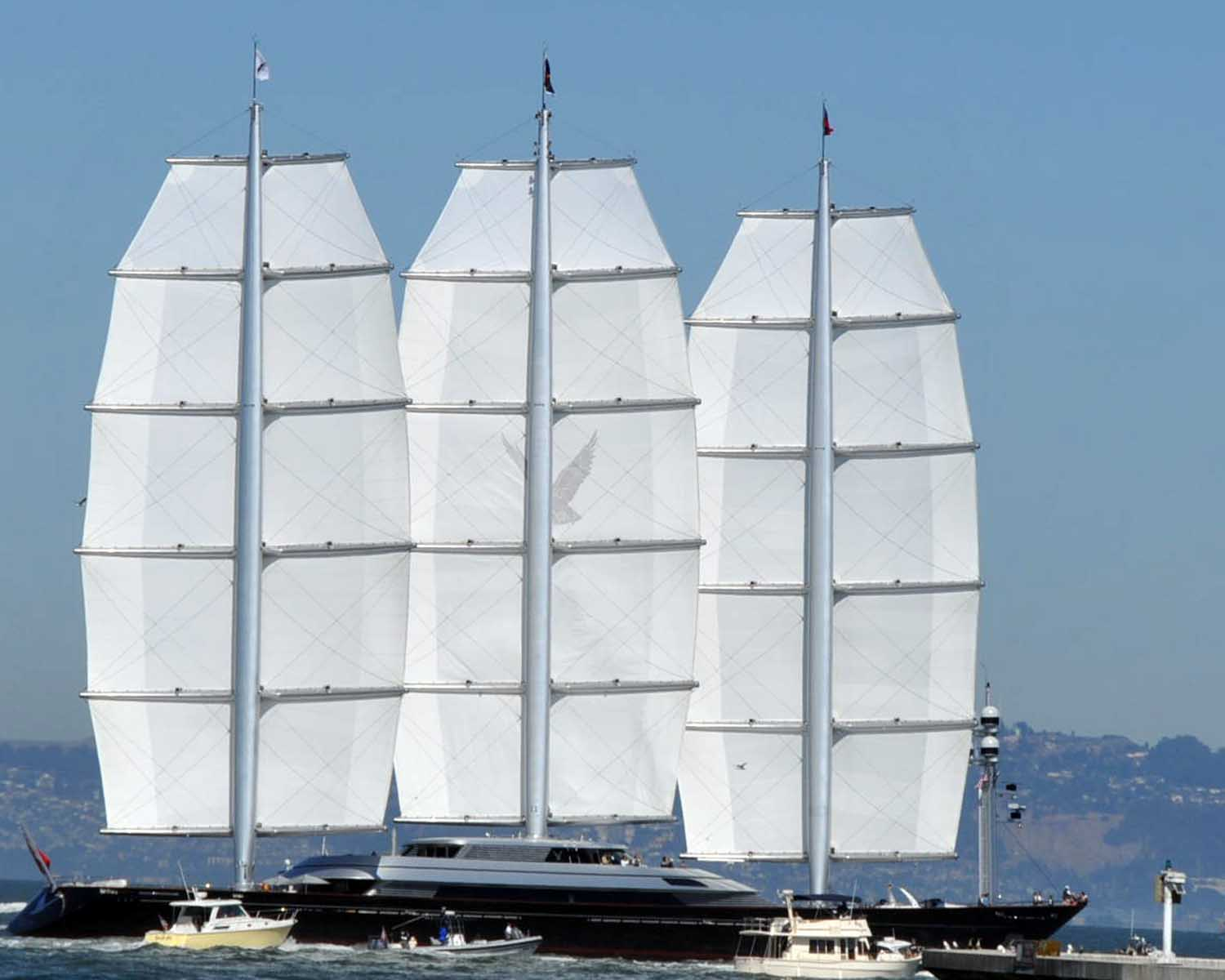
Maltese Falcon sailing yacht in 2008

The Recreational Craft Directive requires that all vessels sold in the European Union and United Kingdom satisfy one of four design categories, based on the wind force and seas that they are designed to encounter:

- A yachts are fit for conditions that exceed wind force 8—40 knots (21 m/s)—and 13-foot (4 m) maximum wave heights, encountered in ocean passages and extended voyages.
- B yachts are fit for conditions that are less than wind force 8—40 knots (21 m/s)—and 13-foot (4 m) maximum wave heights, encountered in ocean passages and extended voyages.
- C yachts are fit for wind force 6—27 knots (14 m/s)—and 6.6-foot (2 m) maximum wave heights, encountered in exposed coastal waters, bays inlets, lakes and rivers.
- D yachts are fit for wind force 4—16 knots (8.2 m/s)—and 1.6-foot (0.5 m) maximum wave heights, encountered in sheltered coastal waters, bays inlets, lakes and rivers.

The Large Commercial Yacht Code (LY2) of Great Britain and its dominions defines a large yacht as one that is 24 metres (79 ft) or more at the waterline and is in commercial use for sport or pleasure, while not carrying cargo or more than 12 passengers and carrying a professional crew. The code regulates the equipping of such vessels, both at sea and in port—including such matters as crew duty times and the presence of a helicopter on board. The code has different levels of standard for vessels above and below 500 gross tons. Such yachts may be considered superyachts and are more commonly at 40 metres (130 ft) or more in length. Other countries have standards similar to LY2.

Whereas commercial large yachts may carry no more than 12 passengers, private yachts are solely for the pleasure of the owner and guests do not carry the passenger restriction. Yachts may be identified by flag—the country under which a yacht is registered. An industry publication categorizes superyachts by size, by speed, as "explorer" yachts, as sailing yachts, and as classic yachts.

== Construction ==
Originally, all yachts were made of wood, using a wooden keel and ribs, clad with planks. These materials were supplanted with iron or steel in steam yachts. In the 1960s fiberglass became a prevalent material. These materials and others continue in use. Whereas yachts of 79 feet (24 m) and below may be constructed of fiberglass, larger yachts are more likely to be constructed of steel, aluminum or composite fiber-reinforced plastic.

- Wood construction, using conventional planks over ribs continues. Hard-chined boats made with plywood is an infrequent technique, whereas yachts made with the WEST system—plies of wood strips, soaked in epoxy and applied over the boat frame—provide a durable, lightweight and robust hull.
- Metal hulls from steel or aluminum offer the opportunity for welding components to a completely watertight hull. Both metals are vulnerable to damage due to electrolysis. Steel is easy to repair in boatyards around the world, whereas aluminum is a much lighter material.
- Fiberglass construction is best suited for mass-produced yachts, using a mold and is therefore the most prevalent material. Fiberglass skins comprise plies of roving (glass fabric) and matting, soaked in resin for the hull. Decks typically have a core of balsa, or PVC foam between layers of glass mat. Both elements of construction are vulnerable to intrusion of water and the development of blisters below the waterline.

== Transport ==
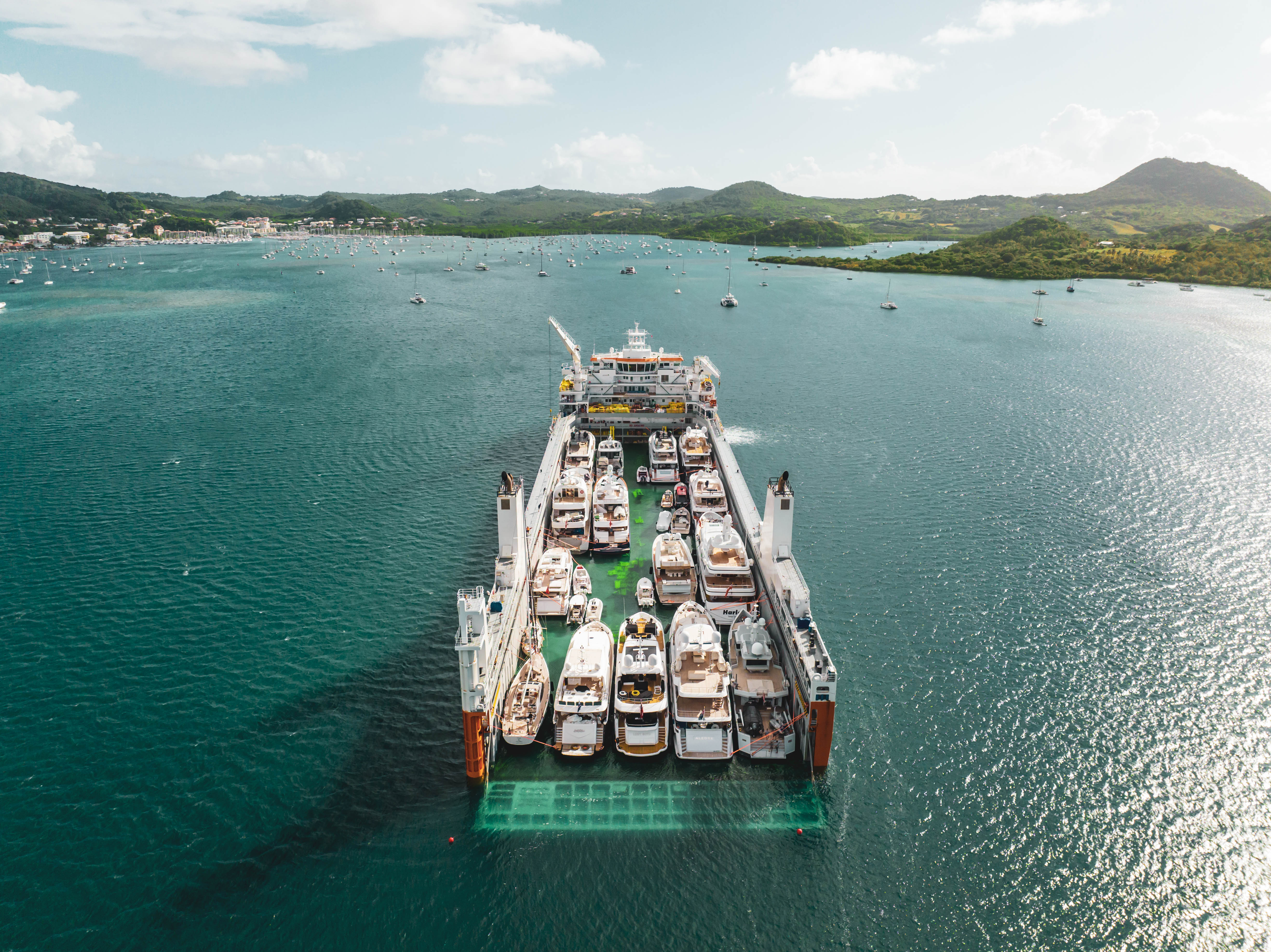
M/V Yacht Servant, with a cargo of yachts, is a purpose-built semi-submersible vessel.

As an alternative to the traditional passaging (sailing or motoring), yachts can also be shipped, usually when the destination and cruising is more important than the passaging, as it generally eliminates costly and time-consuming ocean crossings.

Trailers, whether private or commercial, are often used to transport small yachts for short distances. As the yacht size and the over-land distances increase, yacht owners typically employ commercial trailer services to move vessels.

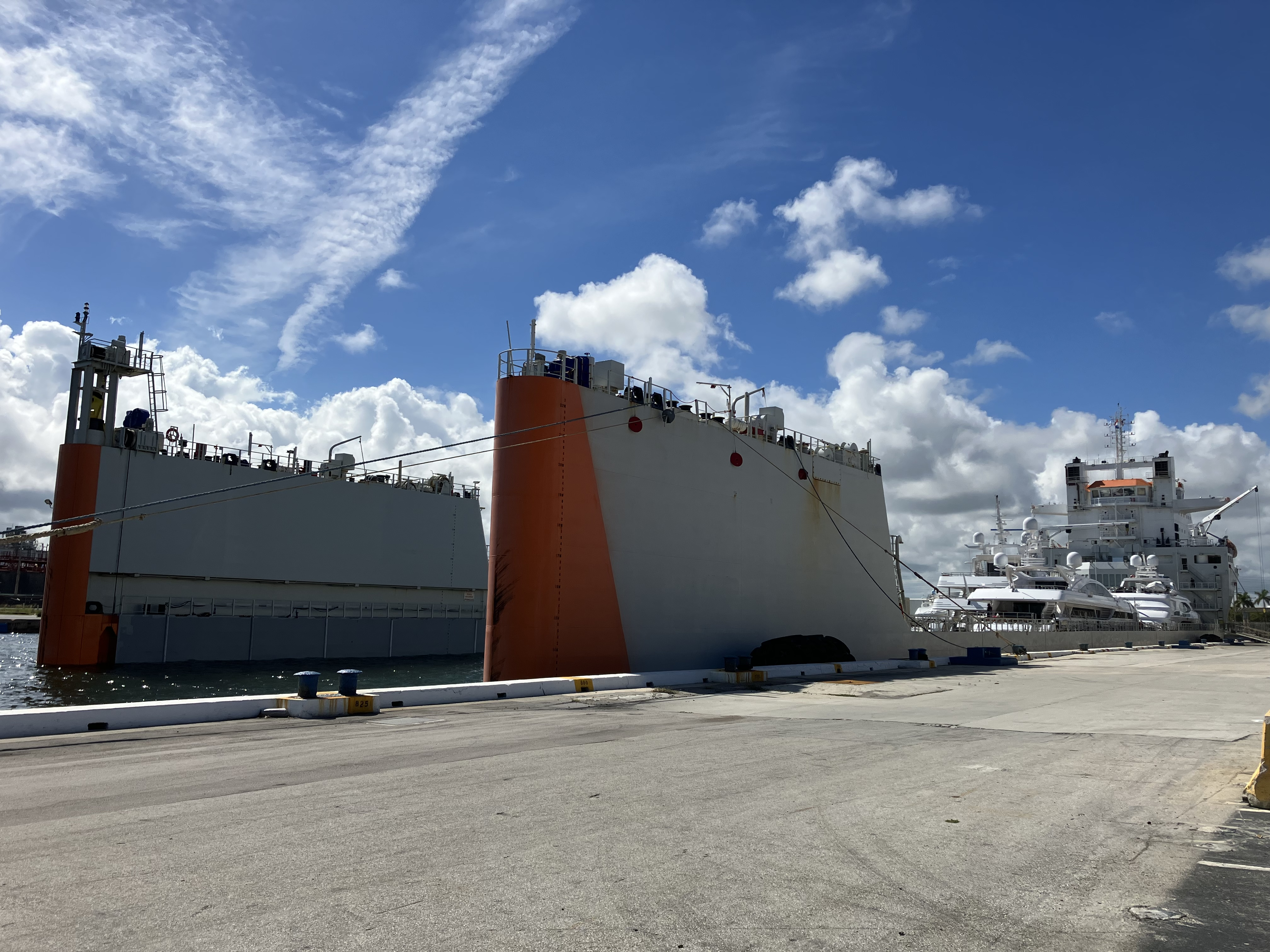
Semi-submersible ship DYT Yacht Express at Port Everglades, Fort Lauderdale, Florida, USA.

Yacht owners sometimes employ semi-submersible ships to relocate their craft to distant cruising grounds. Such ships submerge sufficiently to allow a yacht to be floated on or off a pre-prepared cradle, which shall be certified for marine transport by one of the IACS member, and then re-float, lifting the yacht out of the water for transport. These ships travel among North American, Caribbean, and Pacific-Ocean destinations.

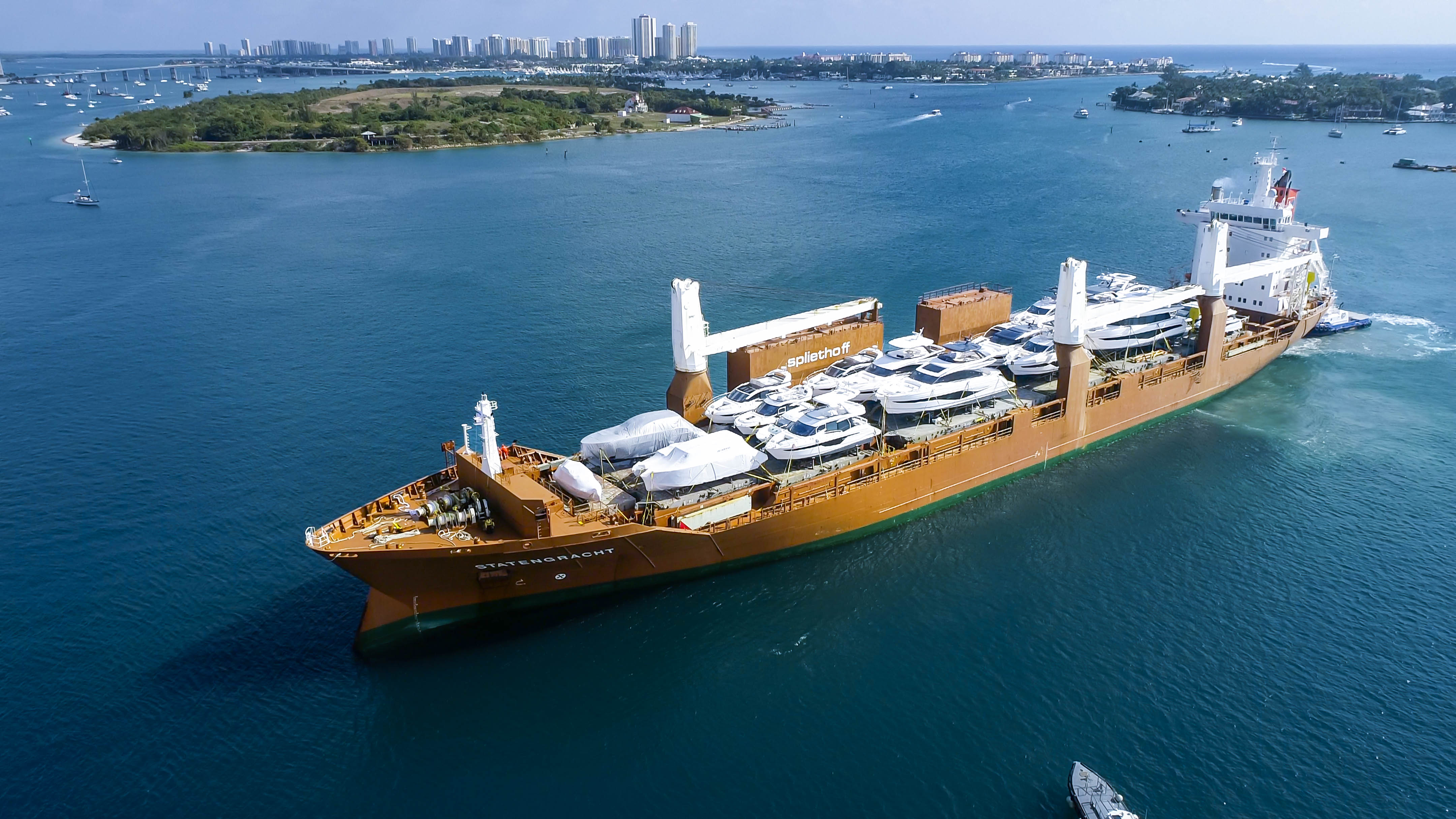
M/V Statengracht, with a cargo of yachts in the port of West Palm Beach, Florida.

Yachts can be shipped as deck and/or underdeck cargo mostly on Heavy-lift ships or Multi-purpose vessels and that is mostly limited to those equipped with their own cranes, which makes a transport less costly comparing to options requiring usage of shore or floating cranes but opens up geographical that have no shore or floating cranes available, and allows the loading and discharging at the protected anchorages without using costly port infrastructure.

Yachts are also transported by container ships, arranged through freight forwarders. Container shipment costs are almost independent of distance shipped and depend more on imbalances in container locations. It is significantly less expensive and has greater flexibility with respect to timing and destinations. The drawback to container cruising is that there are a limited number of yachts that have the necessary sizes that fit in a standard container.

== Accommodations ==
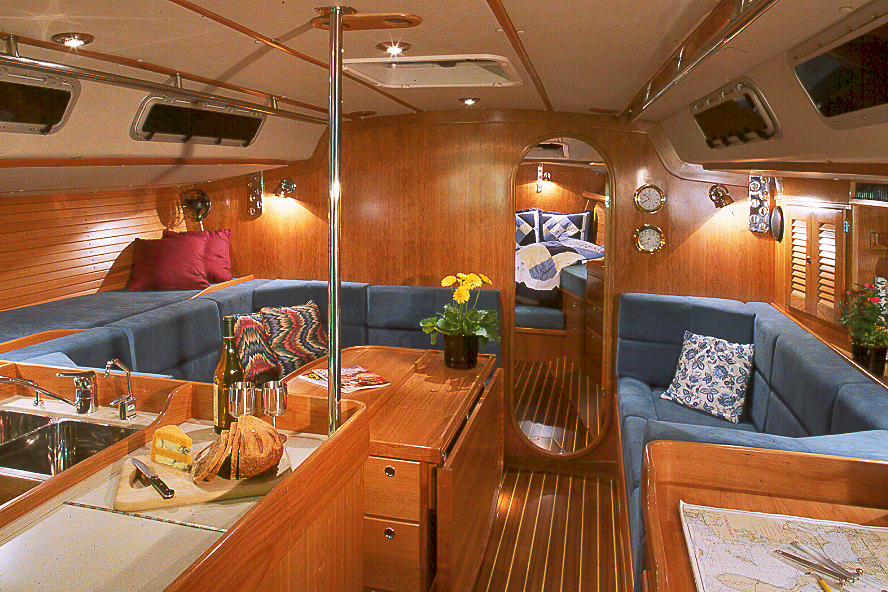
Sailing yacht interior with fold-down table in main salon, galley (kitchen) on left, and navigation station on right and forward cabin visible beyond.

Depending on size, a cruising yacht is likely to have at least two cabins, a main salon and a forward stateroom. In smaller yachts, the salon is likely to have convertible berths for its crew or passengers. Typically the salon includes a dining area, which may have a folding, built-in table. The salon is typically contiguous to the galley. A cruising yacht is likely to have a head (bathroom) with a marine toilet that discharges waste into a holding tank. Larger yachts may have additional staterooms and heads. There is typically a navigation station that allows planning the route.

== Systems ==
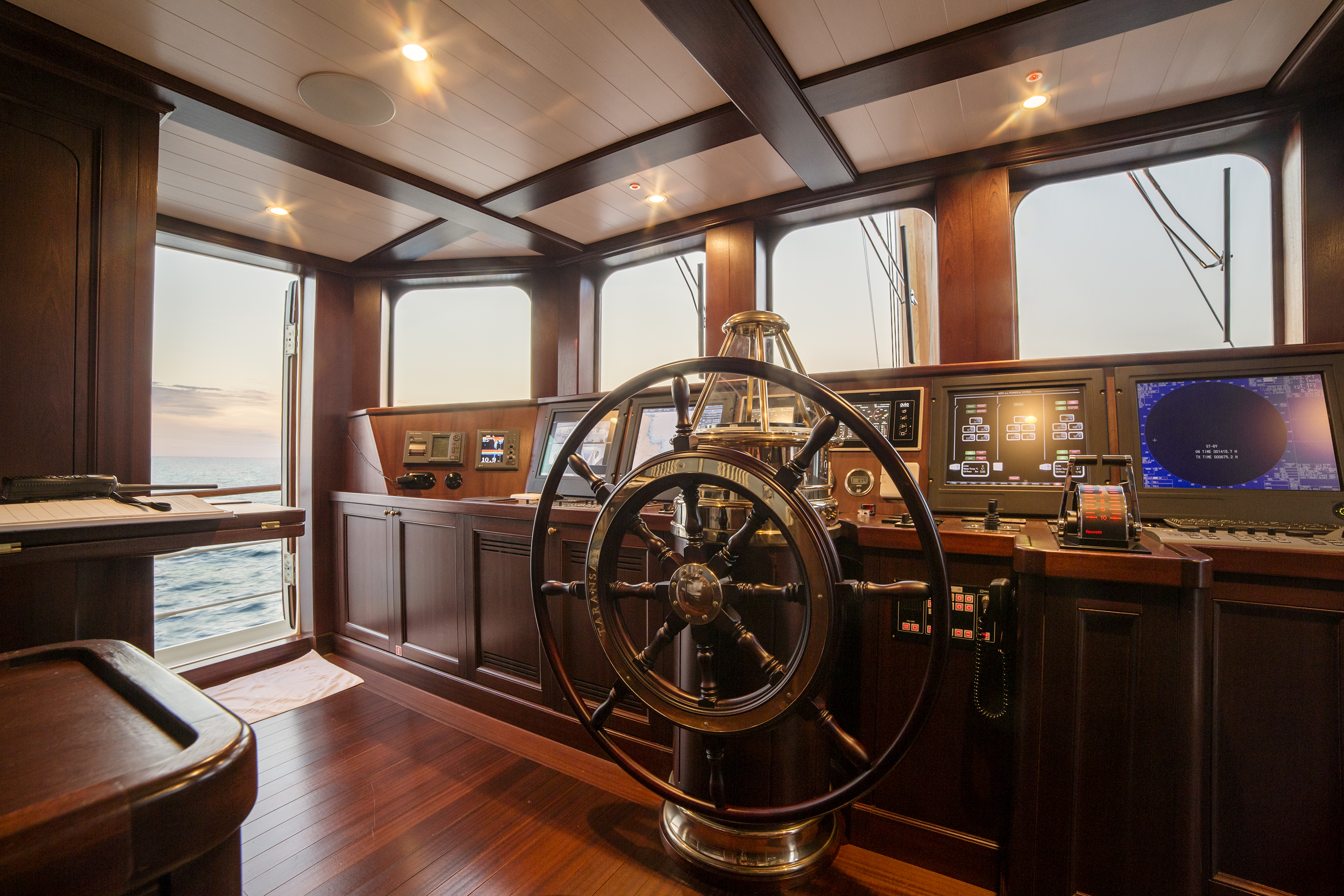
Wheelhouse of motor yacht, Taransay, in 2015 with navigation and systems displays

Onboard systems include:

- Electrical power, provided by batteries recharged by a motor-driven alternator (sail) or by a generator set (motor)
- Water, stored in on-board tanks, refilled on shore or replenished with a desalination water maker
- Sanitation, provided by toilets using seawater and discharged into holding tanks.
- Refrigeration by ice or an engine-driven mechanical system.

Modern yachts employ a suite of electronics for communication, measurement of surroundings, and navigation.

- Communications equipment includes radios in a variety of bandwidths, specifically for maritime use.
- Instrumentation also provides information on depth of water under the vessel (depth sounder), windspeed (anemometer), and directional orientation (compass).
- Navigation electronics include units that identify a vessel's location (e.g. GPS) and display the vessel's location (chartplotter) and other vessels and nearby shore (radar).

== Sailing yachts ==
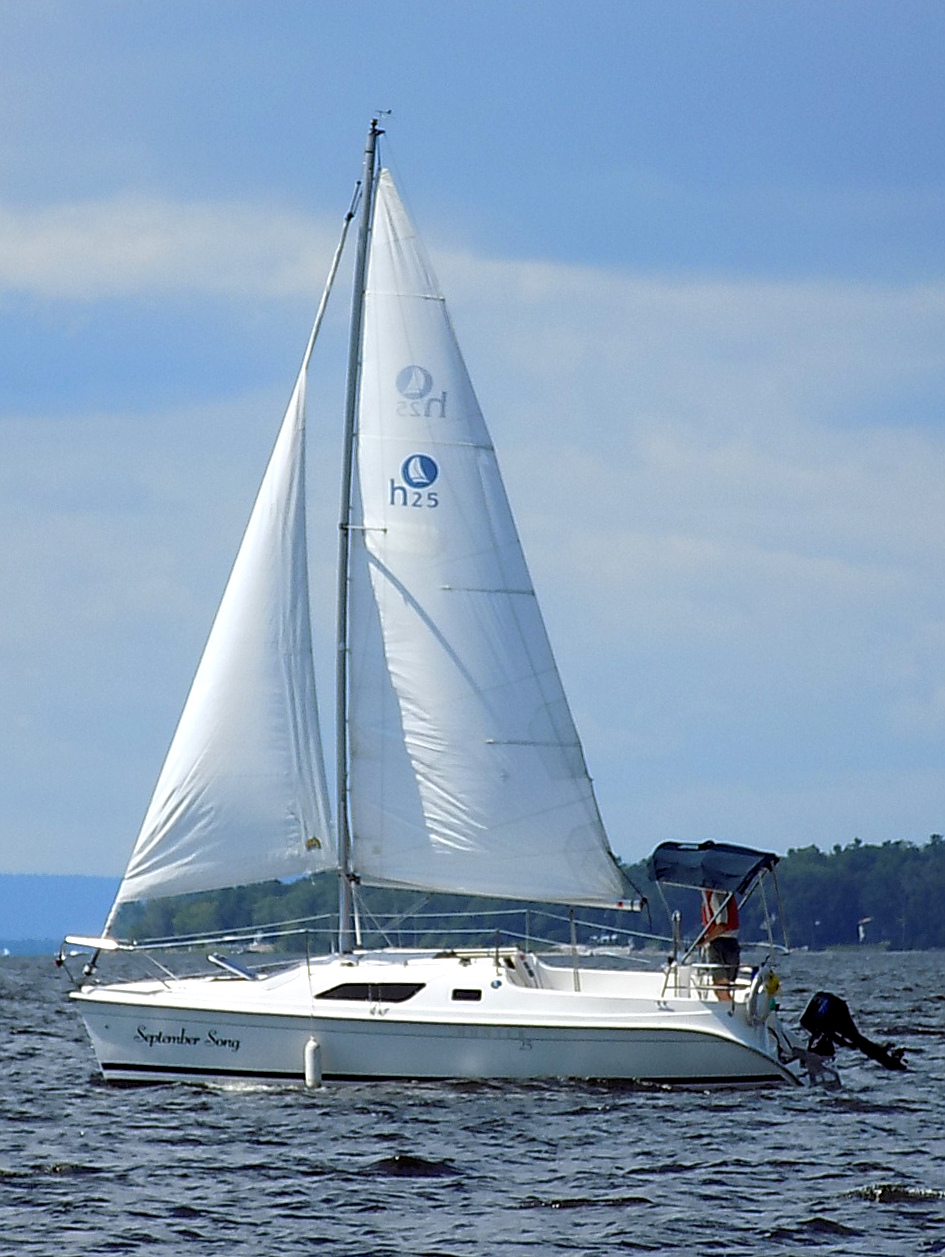
Small sailing yacht with outboard motor in 2017

Sailing yachts for cruising versus racing embody different tradeoffs between comfort and performance. Cruising yachts emphasize comfort over performance. Racing yachts are designed to compete against others in their class, while providing adequate comfort to their crews.

=== Cruising ===
Cruising yachts may be designed for near-shore use or for passage-making. They may also be raced, but they are designed and built with the comfort and amenities necessary for overnight voyages. Qualities considered in cruising yachts include: performance, comfort under way, ease of handling, stability, living comfort, durability, ease of maintenance, affordability of ownership.

==== Categories ====
Cruising sailboats share the common attribute of providing overnight accommodations. They may be classified as small (easy to haul behind a trailer), near-shore and off-shore. Multihull sailing yachts are a category, apart.

- Small yachts are typically shorter than 33 feet (10 m) length overall. Trailer sailers that are readily towed by a car are generally shorter than 25 feet (7.6 m) length overall and weigh less than 5,000 pounds (2,300 kg).
- Near-shore yachts typically range in size from 33–45 feet (10–14 m) length overall.
- Offshore yachts typically exceed 45 feet (14 m) length overall.

==== Design ====
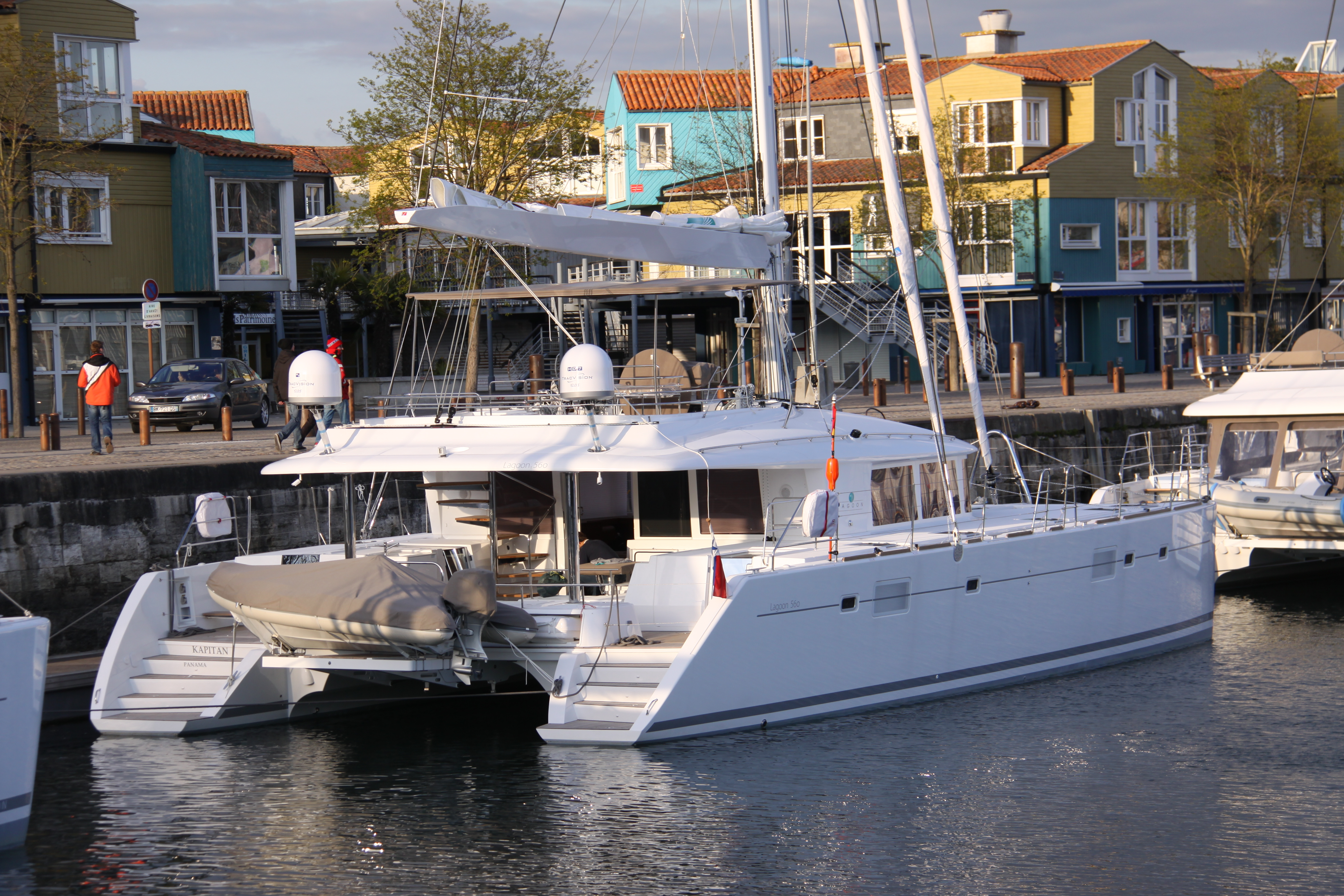
Cruising catamaran in 2012

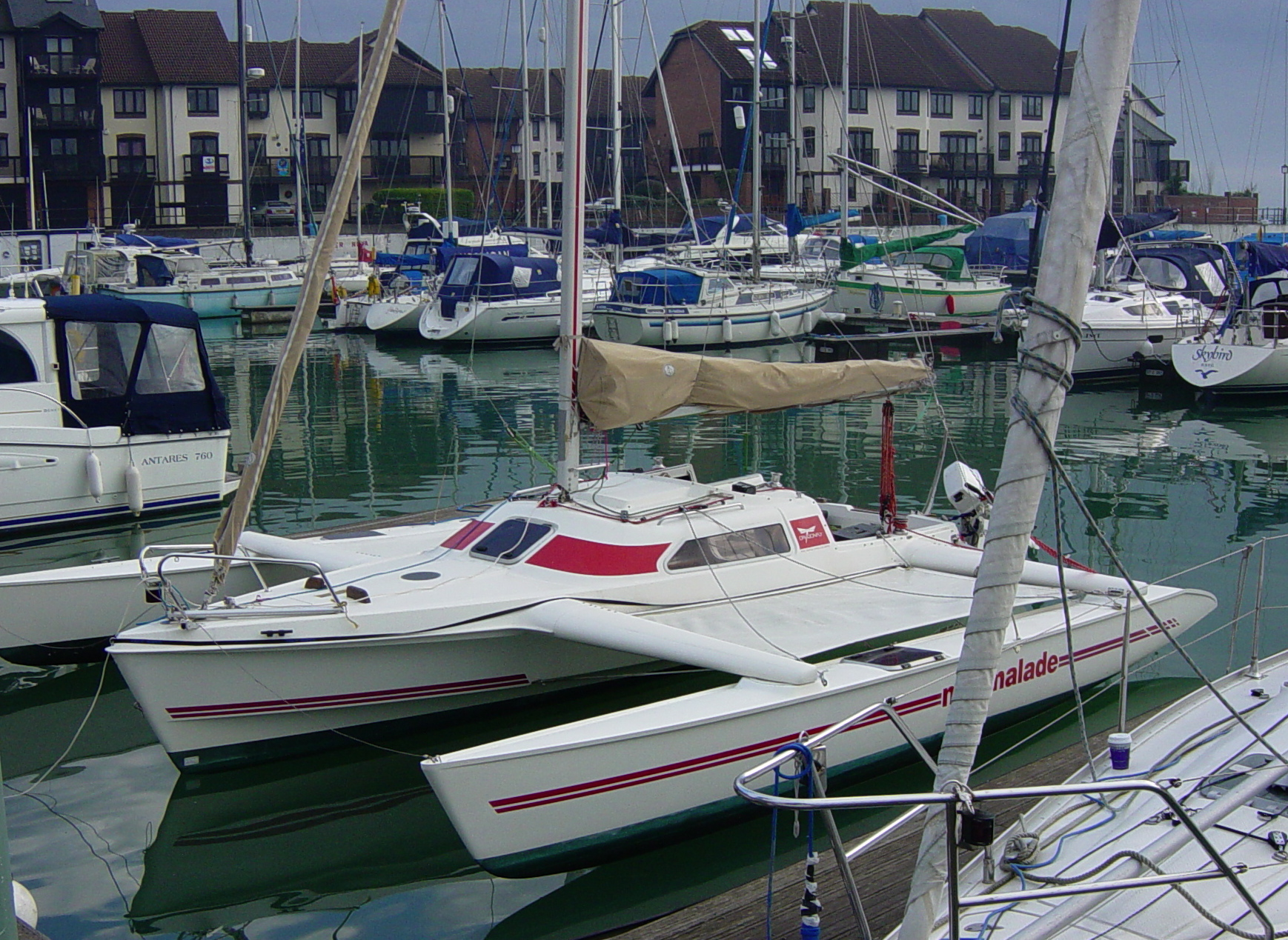
Cruising trimaran with folding amas in 2005

Design considerations for a cruising yacht include seaworthiness, performance, sea kindliness, and cost of construction, as follows:

- Seaworthiness addresses the integrity of the vessel and its ability to stay afloat and shelter its crew in the conditions encountered.
- Performance hinges on a number of factors, including the waterline length (longer means faster), drag in the water (narrower hull with smooth appendages), hull shape, and sail shape and area.
- Sea kindliness is an indicator of steering ease, directional stability and quelling of motion induced by wind and waves.

Multihulls offer tradeoffs as cruising sailboats, compared with monohulls. They may be catamarans or trimarans. They rely on form stability—having separate hulls far apart—for their resistance to capsize. Their advantages include greater: stability, speed, (for catamarans) living space, and shallower draft. Their drawbacks include: greater expenses, greater windage, more difficult tacking under sail, less load capacity, and more maneuvering room required because of their broad beam. They come with a variety of sleeping accommodations and (for catamarans) bridge-deck configurations.

==== Rigs ====
Gaff rigs have been uncommon in the construction of cruising boats, since the mid 20th century. More common rigs are Bermuda, fractional, cutter, and ketch. Occasionally employed rigs since then have been the yawl, schooner, wishbone, catboat.

==== Gear ====
Sailboats employ standing rigging to support the rig, running rigging to raise and adjust sails, cleats to secure lines, winches to work the sheets, and more than one anchor to secure the boat in harbor. A cruising yacht's deck usually has safety line to protect the crew from falling overboard and a bow pulpit to facilitate handling the jib and the anchor. In temperate climates, the cockpit may have a canvas windshield with see-through panels, called a "dodger". Steering may be either by tiller or wheel.

==== Engine ====
Cruising yachts have an auxiliary propulsion power unit to supplement the use of sails. Such power is inboard on the vessel and diesel, except for the smallest cruising boats, which may have an outboard gasoline motor. A 31-foot (9.4 m) sailboat might have a 13-horsepower (9.7 kW) engine, whereas a 55-foot (17 m) sailboat might have a 110-horsepower (82 kW) engine.

=== Racing ===
Racing yacht, Comanche, beginning a 2015 transatlantic race

Racing yachts emphasize performance over comfort. World Sailing recognizes eleven classes of racing yacht.

==== Design features ====
High-performance rigs provide aerodynamic efficiency and hydrodynamically efficient hulls minimize drag through the water and sideways motion.

Racing yachts have a wide selection of weights and shapes of sail to accommodate different wind strengths and points of sail. A suite of sails on a racing yachts would include several weights of jib and spinnaker, plus a specialized storm jib and trysail (in place of the mainsail). Performance yachts are likely to have full-battened kevlar or carbon-fiber mainsails.

Underwater foils can become more specialized, starting with a higher-aspect ratio fin keel with hydrodynamically efficient bulbs for ballast. On some racing yachts, a canting keel shifts angle from side to side to promote sailing with less heeling angle (sideway tilt), while other underwater foils take care of leeway (sideways motion).

An example for a full-rigged ship yacht which is also one of the world's most complex and largest sailing yachts at 88 m (289 ft) is the Maltese Falcon.

== Motor yachts ==
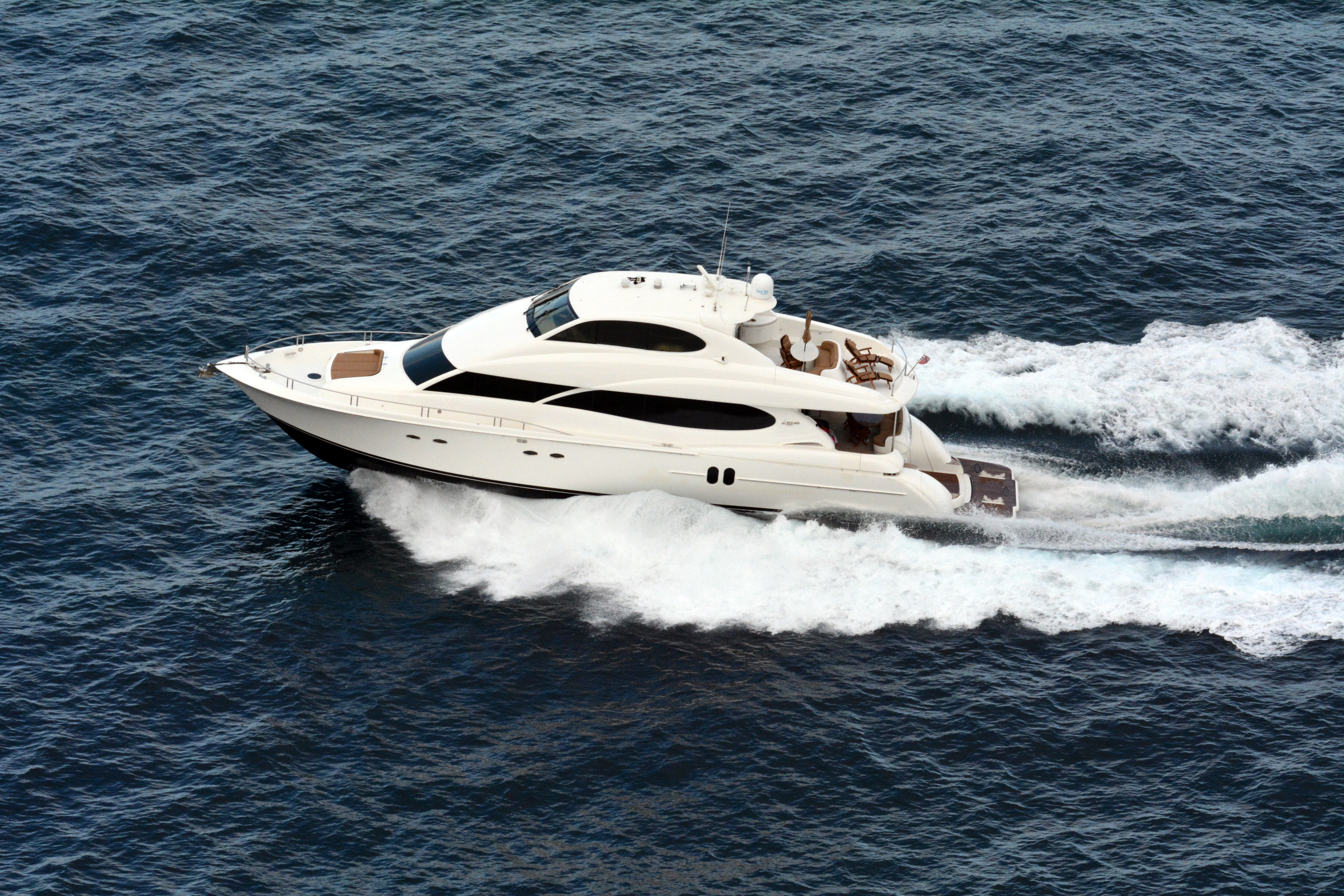
Lazzara 80-foot (24 m) planing-hull, sports-cruiser motor yacht in 2014

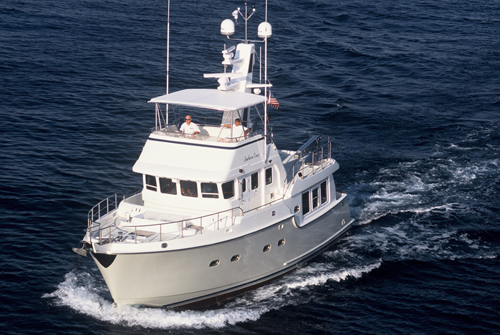
Nordhavn 47-foot (14 m) displacement-hull, expedition-style motor yacht in 2005

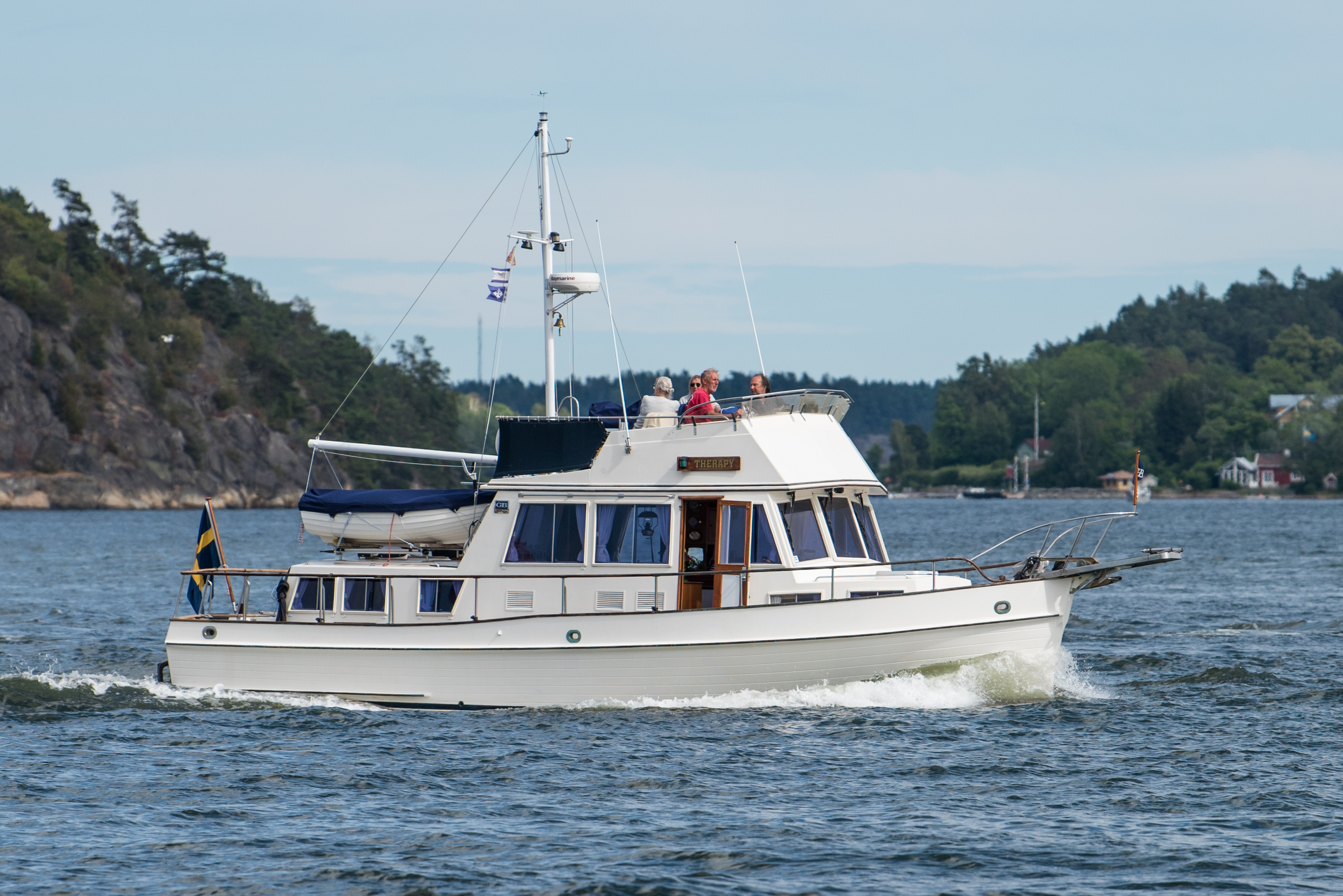
Grand Banks 42-foot (13 m) displacement-hull, trawler-style motor yacht in 2018

Motor yachts range in length from 33–130 feet (10–40 m) before they are considered superyachts, which are 130 feet (40 m) and longer. They also vary by use, by style, and by hull type. As of April 2020 a 600-foot (180 m) yacht, REV Ocean, was under construction, which when launched would replace the 590-foot (180 m) Azzam as the longest superyacht.

=== Classification ===
The United States Coast Guard classifies motorboats—any vessel less than 65 feet (20 m), propelled by machinery—in four classes by length:

- Class A: motorboats less than 16 feet (4.9 m)
- Class 1: motorboats 16–26 feet (4.9–7.9 m)
- Class 2: motorboats 26–40 feet (7.9–12.2 m)
- Class 3: motorboats 40–65 feet (12–20 m)

=== Style ===
A motor yacht's style can both be functional and evoke an aesthetic—trending towards the modern or the traditional. Among the styles, mentioned in the literature, are:

- Cruiser – A cruiser has a displacement hull for economical, long-distance passage-making.
- Sports cruiser – A sports cruiser has a semi-displacement or planing hull for fast trips.
- Sports fisherman – A sports fisherman has a semi-displacement or planing hull for fast trips and carries gear for recreational catching of large fish.
- Expedition – An expedition yacht has a displacement hull for economical, long-distance passage-making to remote destinations. These are also called explorer yachts.
- Lobster – A lobster yacht is styled like a Maine lobster boat and has a semi-displacement or planing hull for fast trips.
- Trawler – A trawler has conservative, traditional styling and has a displacement hull for economical, medium-distance passage-making.

=== Hulls ===
There are three basic types of motor yacht hull: full-displacement, semi-displacement, and planing, which have progressively higher cruise speeds and hourly fuel consumption with increased engine power:

- Full-displacement hulls move the water up and out of the way of the vessel, making a wave. They are limited in speed by the square root of the waterline length multiplied by a factor, depending on the units used. Added horsepower cannot increase the maximum speed, only the size of the waves produced.
- Semi-displacement hulls allow speeds that are faster than the hull speed of a displacement vessel because they rise somewhat out of the water and create smaller waves. They also provide greater comfort than planing hulls.
- Planing hulls require sufficient power for the boat to plane on the surface, which avoids the need to use power to lift water out of the way of the vessel. Such vessels have flat surfaces on the undersides.

A typical semi-displacement yacht has a wedge-shaped bow, which promotes penetrating waves, that transitions to flatter, wider surfaces aft, which promotes lifting the vessel out of the water—the "deep vee" hull, designed by Ray Hunt, found in approximately 75% of modern power boats.

Cruising motor yachts are available in a range of styles as two-engine catamarans, ranging in length from 40–150 feet (12–46 m) with top speeds ranging from 20–60 knots (37–111 km/h).

=== Engines ===
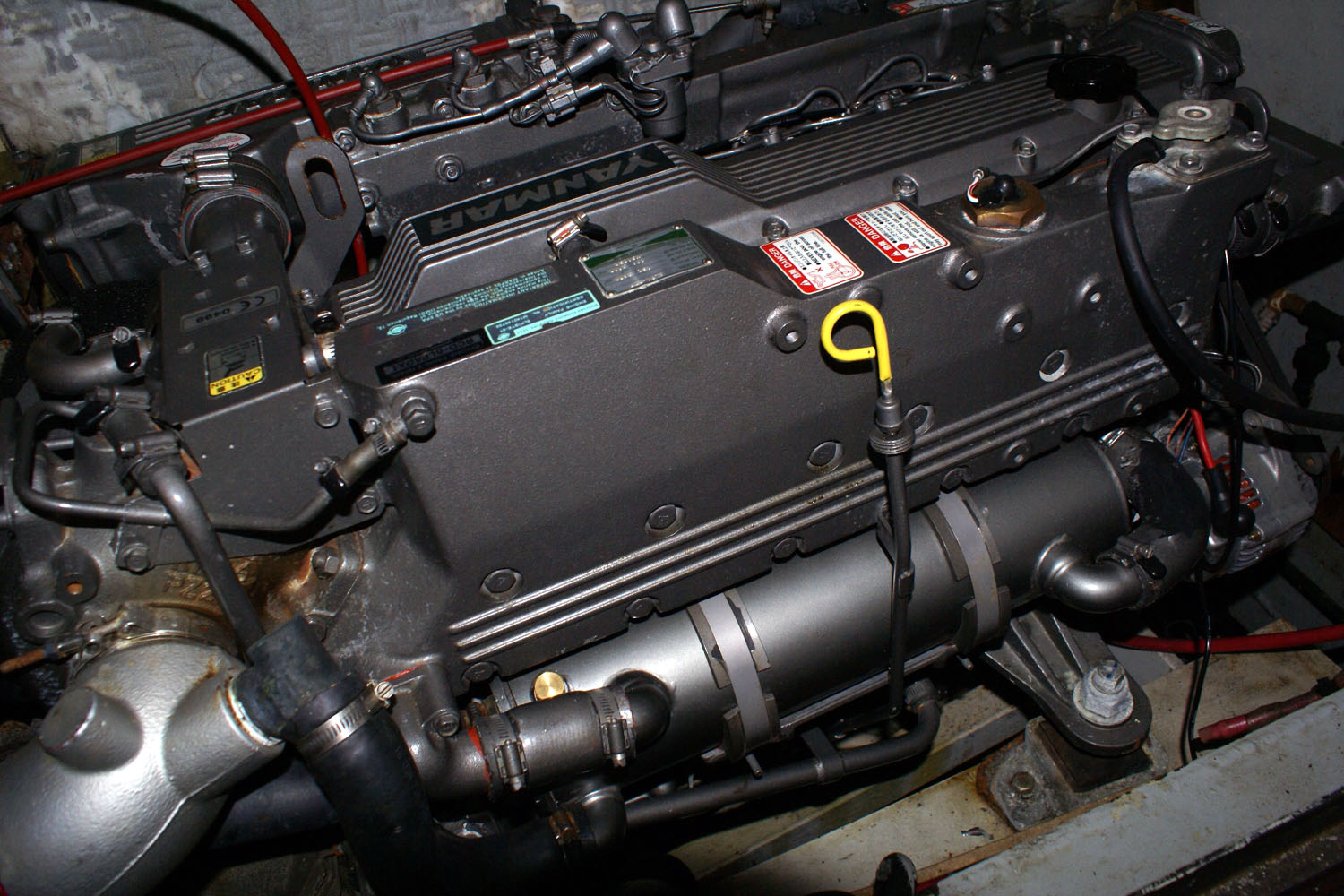
260-horsepower (190 kW) diesel marine engine

Motor yachts typically have one or more diesel engines. Gasoline-powered motors and engines are the provenance of outboard motors and racing boats, due to their power-to-weight ratios. Two engines add expense, but provide reliability and maneuverability over a single engine.

Motor yachts in the 42-foot (13 m) range might have the following hull, horsepower, cruise speed, and hourly fuel consumption characteristics:

- Full-displacement hull – two 135-horsepower (101 kW) diesels to cruise at 9 knots (17 km/h), consuming 5 US gallons per hour (19 L/h).
- Semi-displacement hull – two 350-horsepower (260 kW) diesels to cruise at 17 knots (31 km/h), consuming 12 US gallons per hour (45 L/h).
- Planing hull – two 400-horsepower (300 kW) diesels to cruise at 30 knots (56 km/h), consuming 24 US gallons per hour (90 L/h).

Superyachts may employ multiple 9,000-horsepower (6,700 kW) diesels or a combination of diesels and gas turbines with a combined 47,000 horsepower (35,000 kW).

== See also ==
- World Sailing
- List of keelboat classes designed before 1970
- List of large sailing yachts
- List of motor yachts by length
- List of sailing boat types
- List of sailboat designers and manufacturers
- Model yachting
- Superyacht
- Yacht broker
- Yacht charter
- Yacht racing
- Yacht transport
- Yacht tender
- Yacht support vessel
- Yachting
- Sailing yacht
