= A18-class container ship =

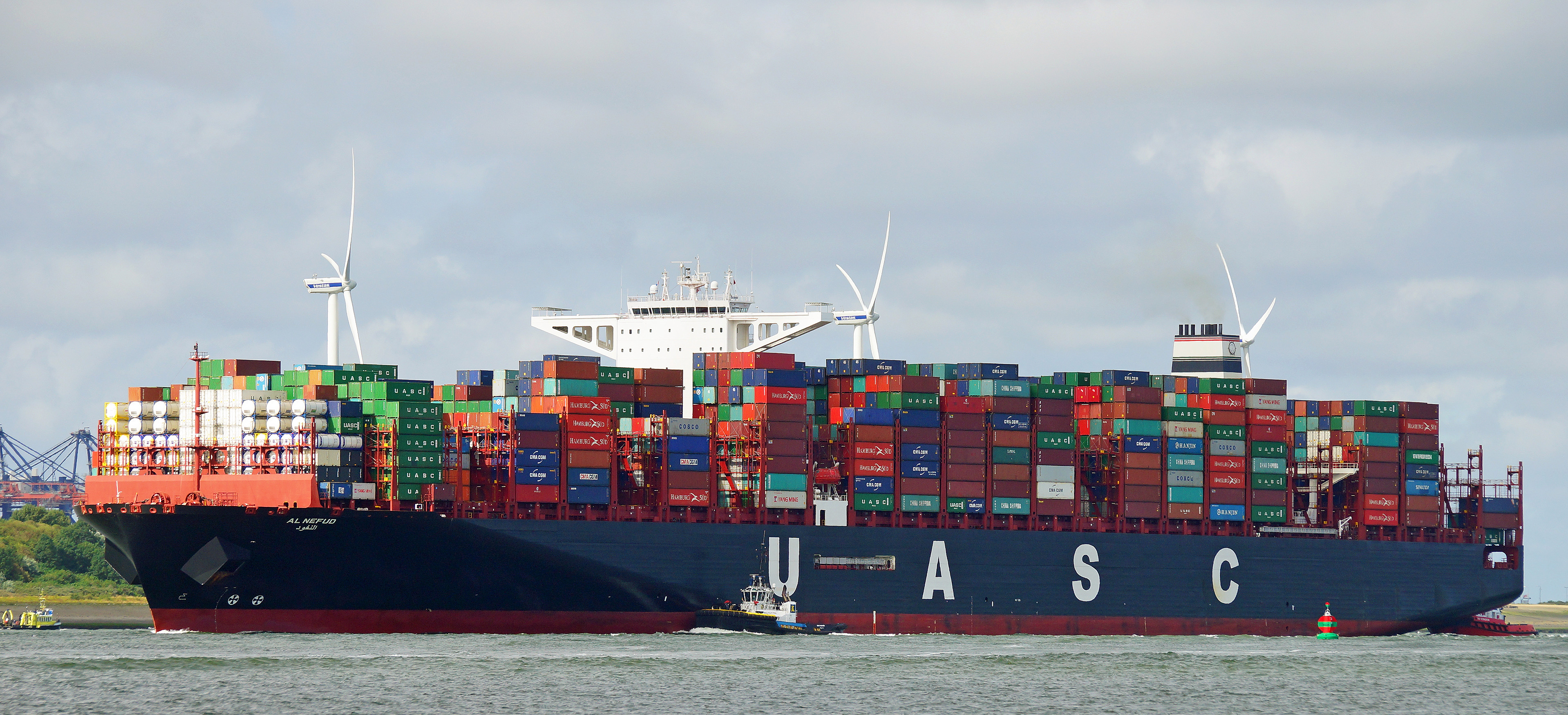
- Al Nefud in the port of Rotterdam

Class overview
- Builders: Hyundai Heavy Industries
- Operators: Hapag-Lloyd
- In service: 2015–present
- Planned: 6
- Completed: 6
- Active: 6

General characteristics
- Type: Container ship
- Tonnage: 195,636 GT
- Length: 400 m (1,312 ft 4 in)
- Beam: 58.6 m (192 ft 3 in)
- Draft: 16 m (52 ft 6 in)
- Propulsion: MAN 10S90ME-C9&10
- Capacity: 19,870 TEU

The A18 class (also called the A19 class) is a series of six container ships originally built for the United Arab Shipping Company (UASC) and now operated by Hapag-Lloyd. The ships have a maximum theoretical capacity of 19,870 TEU. The ships were built by Hyundai Heavy Industries in South Korea.

== List of ships ==
Ship	Yard number	IMO number	Delivery	Status	ref
Hyundai Heavy Industries Samho shipyard
Barzan	S746	9708851	8 May 2015	In service	
Al Muraykh	S747	9708863	21 Aug 2015	In service	
Al Zubara	S748	9708875	17 Dec 2015	In service	
Hyundai Heavy Industries Ulsan shipyard
Al Nefud	2717	9708813	3 Nov 2015	In service	
Al Dahna	2718	9708825	8 Jan 2016	In service	
Tihama	2719	9736107	3 Feb 2016	In service	

== See also ==
- A15-class container ship
- A13-class container ship
