= A15-class container ship =

Ship class

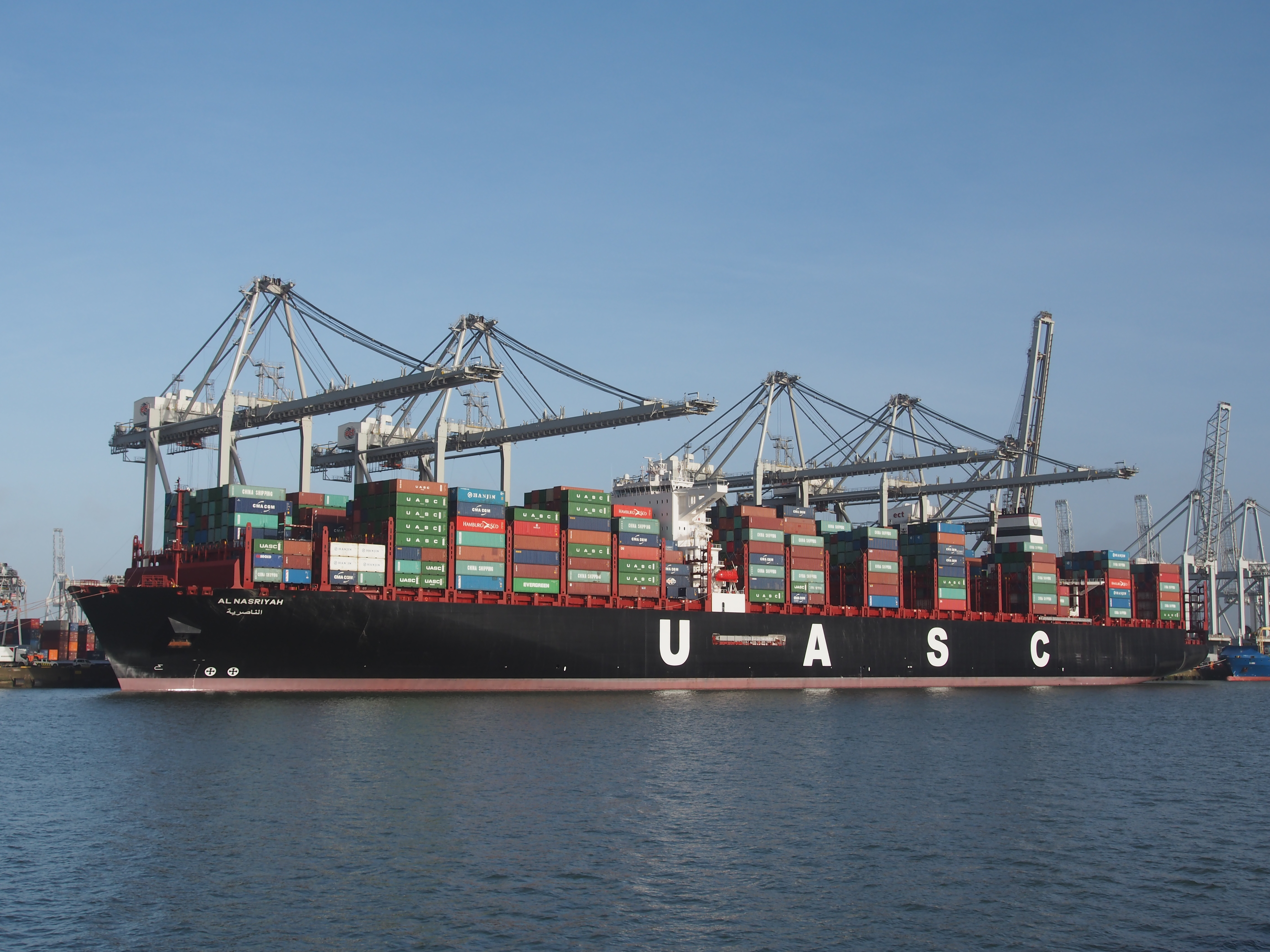
- Al Nasriyah in the port of Rotterdam

Class overview
- Builders: Hyundai Heavy Industries
- Operators: Hapag-Lloyd
- In service: 2014–present
- Planned: 11
- Completed: 11
- Active: 11

General characteristics
- Type: Container ship
- Tonnage: 153,148 GT
- Length: 368.5 m (1,209 ft 0 in)
- Beam: 51 m (167 ft 4 in)
- Draught: 15.52 m (50 ft 11 in)
- Propulsion: MAN B&W 9S90ME-C10.2
- Capacity: 14,993 TEU

The A15 class is a series of 11 container ships originally built for the United Arab Shipping Company (UASC) and now operated by Hapag-Lloyd. The ships have a maximum theoretical capacity of 14,993 TEU. The ships were built by Hyundai Heavy Industries in South Korea.

== List of ships ==
Ship	Yard number	IMO number	Delivery	Status	ref
Hyundai Heavy Industries Ulsan shipyard
Sajir	2714	9708784	4 Dec 2014	In service	
Salahuddin	2715	9708796	30 Jan 2015	In service	
Linah	2716	9708801	20 May 2015	In service	
Hyundai Heavy Industries Samho shipyard
Al Murabba	S737	9708837	2 Jan 2015	In service	
Al Nasriyah	S738	9708849	1 Oct 2015	In service	
Al Dhail	S739	9732307	20 Jan 2016	In service	
Al Mashrab	S740	9732319	4 Mar 2016	In service	
Al Jasrah	S741	9732321	2 May 2016	In service	
Umm Qarn	S742	9732333	17 Jun 2016	In service	
Afif	S743	9732345	27 Jul 2017	In service	
Al Jmeliyah	S744	9732357	28 Sep 2017	In service	

== See also ==
- A18-class container ship
- A13-class container ship
