= Taransay (yacht) =

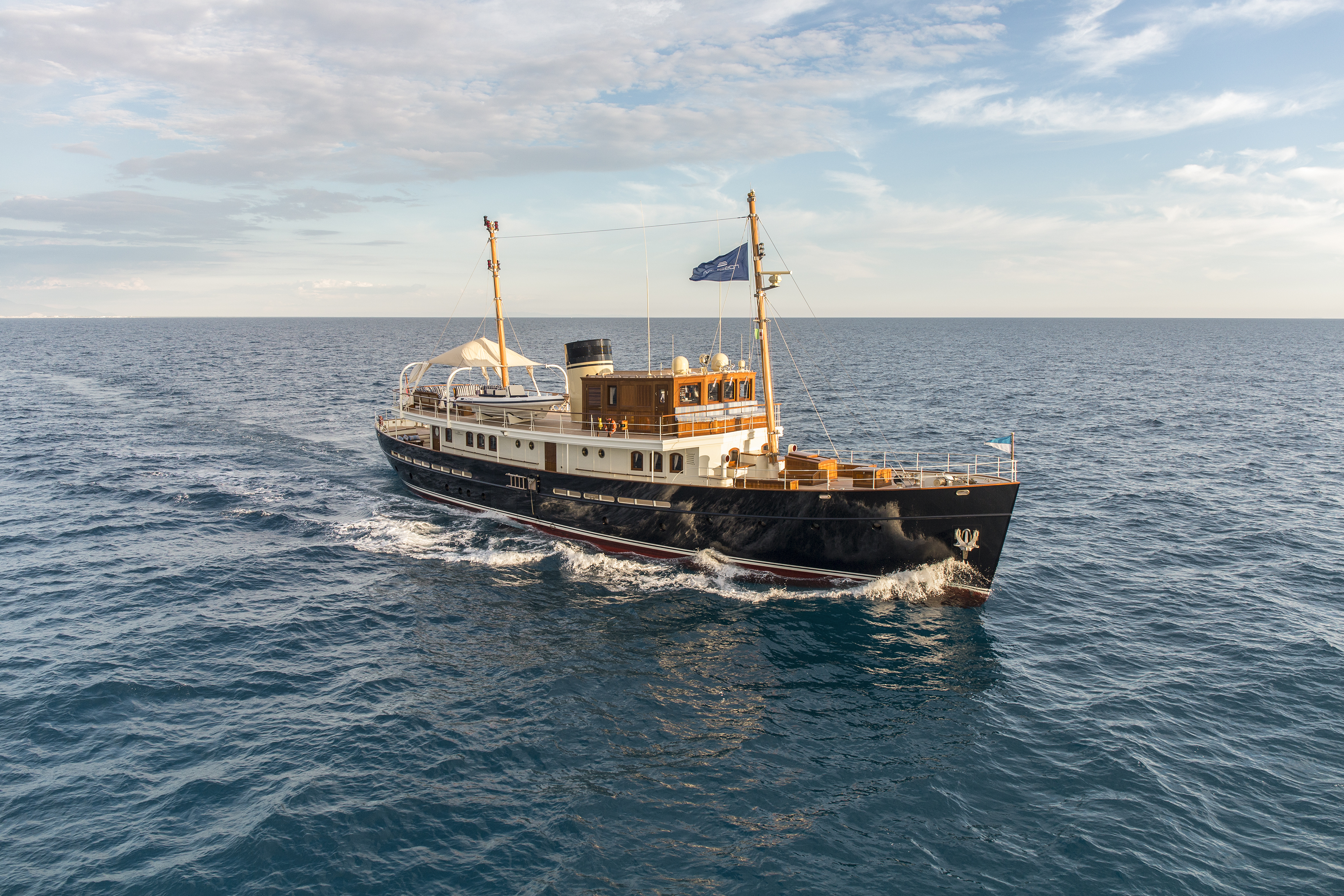
- Taransay cruising

History
- Name: Taransay
- Ordered: 2013
- Builder: Rossinavi
- Yard number: FR029
- Launched: 18 April 2015
- Completed: June 2015
- Name: Taransay
- Home port: Valletta, Malta
- Identification: IMO number: 9776054; MMSI number: 256428000; Callsign: 9HB4343
- Status: In active service

General characteristics
- Type: Luxury yacht
- Tonnage: <300 GT
- Length: 39.3 metres (129 ft) overall
- Beam: 7.6 metres (25 ft)
- Draught: 2.5 metres (8 ft 2 in) calculated
- Decks: 3
- Installed power: Two Caterpillar C 18 Acert EPA TIER 3 599kW
- Speed: 14 knots (26 km/h; 16 mph) (maximum); 12 knots (22 km/h; 14 mph) (cruising at half load)
- Range: 3,500 nautical miles (6,500 km; 4,000 mi) at 10 knots (19 km/h; 12 mph)
- Capacity: 10 guests
- Crew: 7

Taransay is a 39-meter luxury motor yacht built by the Italian shipyard Rossinavi. Delivered in 2015, Taransay is a modern replica of a 1930 yacht of the same name. Taransay's exterior styling was done by Rossinavi and STB Italia. Its interior was designed by Tassin Design.

Taransay is the namesake of the Scottish island in the Outer Hebrides.

== History ==
In 2013, the German owner of a old motor yacht built in 1930 decided to reproduce it with modern technology. It yacht was designed by GL Watso, then redesigned by Tassin Design company.

Launched by shipyard Rossinavi in Viareggio in April 2015, Taransay left for its first cruise just two months after. At the 2015 Monaco Yacht Show that September, Taransay received the prestigious Monaco Award for its originality and distinction.

Taransay can accommodate 10 guests in 5 cabins (master suite, 1 double cabin and 3 twin cabins) and 7 crew. Powered by 2 Caterpillar (C18 Acert) 803 hp diesel engines and propelled by twin screws, Taransay can cruise at 12 knots and make 14 knots.

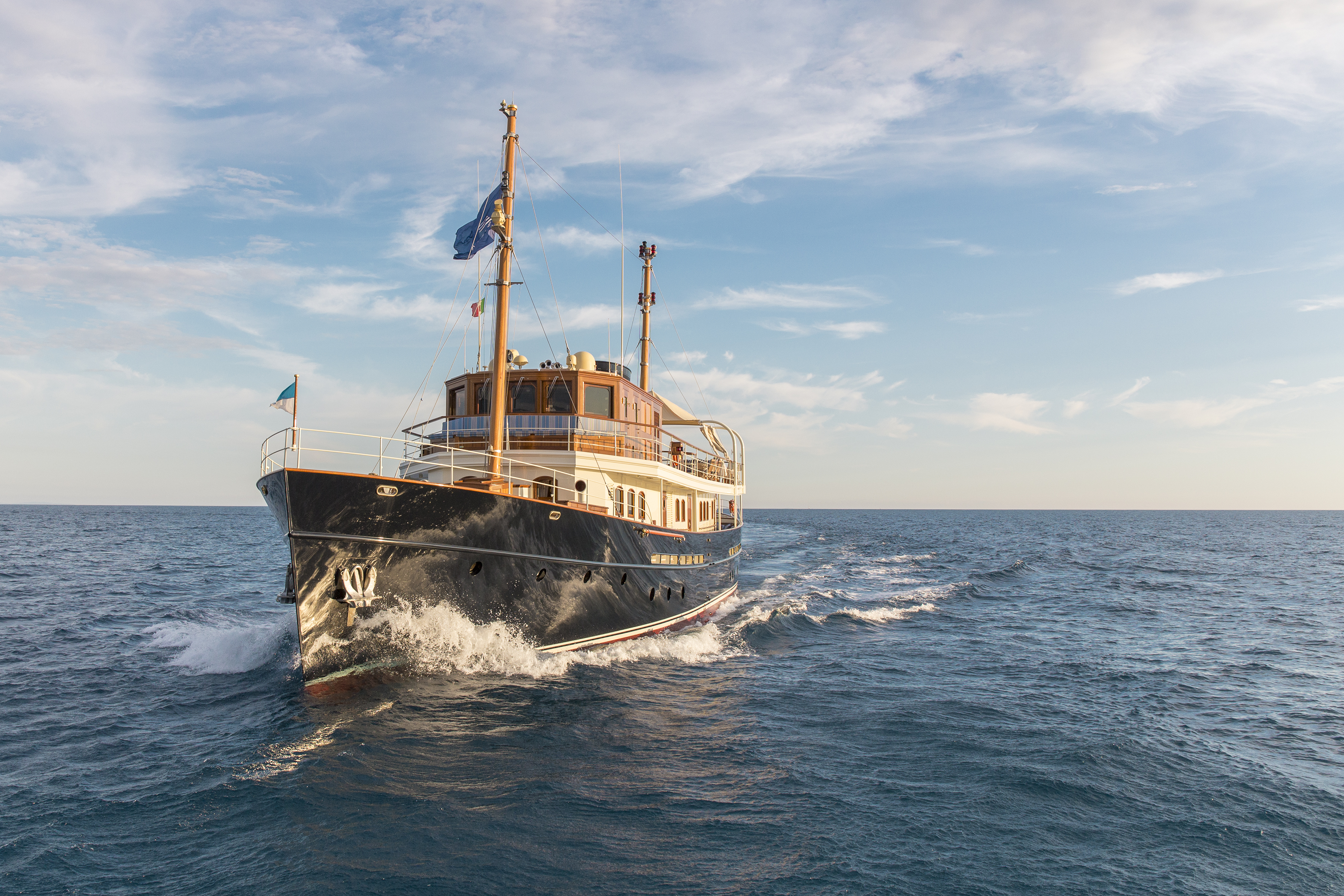
Taransay cruising in Mediterranean sea

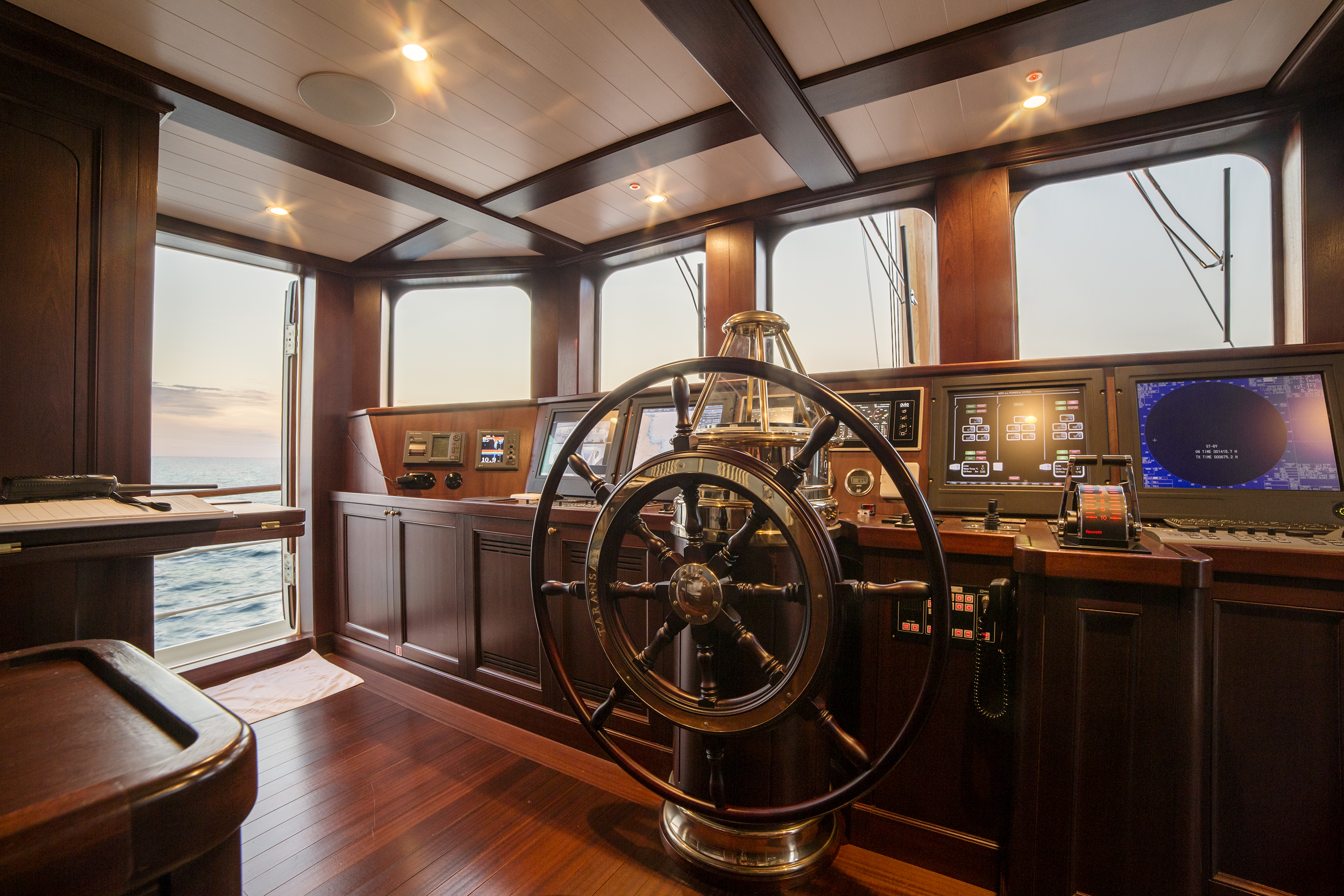
Wheelhouse of the yacht

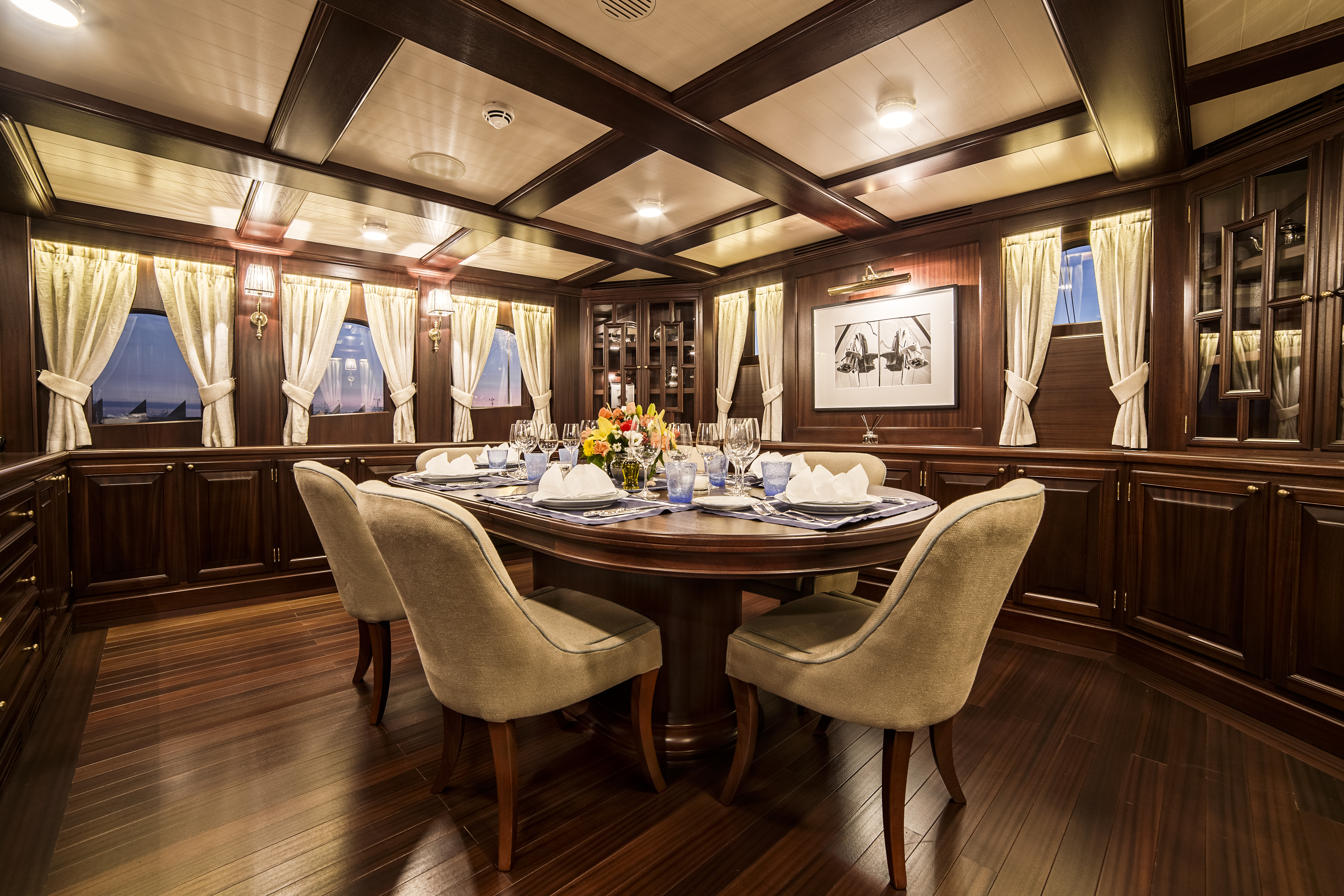
Dining room

== Awards ==
- Monaco Yacht Show Monaco Award 2015
- RINA Green Plus 2015
- ISS Design and Leadership Awards Best yacht between 24 and 40 m Winner Taransay
