= List of ship launches in 2019 =

The list of ship launches in 2019 includes a chronological list of ships launched or scheduled to be launched in 2019.

Date	Ship	Class / type	Builder	Location	Country	Notes
5 January	MSC Grandiosa	Meraviglia-plus class cruise ship	Chantiers de l'Atlantique	Saint-Nazaire	France	For MSC Cruises
14 January	Mærsk Houston	Maersk H-class container ship	Hyundai Heavy Industries		South Korea	For Maersk Line
16 January	Stena Estrid	E-Flexer-class ferry	AVIC		China	for Stena Line
January	Celebrity Flora	cruise ship	DeHoop		Netherlands	For Celebrity Cruises
8 February	Scarlet Lady	cruise ship	Fincantieri	Genoa	Italy	For Virgin Voyages
9 February	Seven Seas Splendor	cruise ship	Fincantieri	Ancona	Italy	For Regent Seven Seas Cruises
9 February	Hanseatic inspiration	Expedition-class cruise ship	VARD Tulcea SA	Tulcea	Romania	For Hapag-Lloyd Kreuzfahrten
14 February	Sky Princess	Royal-class cruise ship	Fincantieri	Monfalcone	Italy	For Princess Cruises
15 February	Tasman		Royal Bodewes	Hoogezand	Netherlands	
22 February	Ever Govern	Evergreen G-class container ship	Imabari Shipbuilding	Marugame	Japan	For Evergreen Marine
25 February	Spectrum of the Seas	Quantum-Ultra-class cruise ship	Meyer Werft	Papenburg	Germany	For Royal Caribbean International
28 February	Atair		German Naval Yards	Kiel	Germany	
28 February	Magellan Explorer		ASENAV	Valdivia	Chile	For Antarctica21
1 March	Arklow Wind		Ferus Smit	Leer	Germany	For Arklow Shipping
9 March	MSC Gülsün	Gülsün-class container ship	Koje	Samsung Heavy Industries	South Korea	For MSC
12 March	Greg Mortimer	Infinity-class cruise ship	CMHI yard		China	For SunStone Ships
15 March	Costa Smeralda	Excellence-class cruise ship	Meyer Turku	Turku	Finland	For Costa Crociere
27 March	Cosco Shipping Planet	Universe-class container ship	Shanghai WaiGaoQiao Shipbuilding	Shanghai	China	For China COSCO Shipping
28 March	Aalborg White		Royal Bodewes	Foxhol	Netherlands	
March	Bamberg		Fassmer	Berne	Germany	
8 April	Leevsten		Flensburger Schiffbau Gesellschaft	Flensburg	Germany	For Siem Group
11 April	Shetland		Ferus Smit	Westerbroek	Netherlands	
13 April	MSC Mina	Gülsün-class container ship	Koje	Daewoo Shipbuilding & Marine Engineering	South Korea	For MSC
13 April	MSC Samar	Gülsün-class container ship		Samsung Heavy Industries	South Korea	For MSC
15 April	Stena Edda	E-Flexer-class ferry	AVIC		China	for Stena Line
18 April	Alsace	Aquitaine-class frigate	Naval Group	Lorient	France	For French Navy
27 April	MSC Isabella	Gülsün-class container ship		Daewoo Shipbuilding & Marine Engineering	South Korea	For MSC
April		Road Ferry 8117E3	Damen Galati		Romania	For BC Ferries
April		Road Ferry 8117E3	Damen Galati		Romania	For BC Ferries
7 May	Bad Düben	Potsdam-class police vessel	Western Baltija Shipbuilding	Klaipėda	Lithuania	For Federal Police
12 May	Magen	Sa'ar 6-class corvette	German Naval Yards	Kiel	Germany	For Israeli Navy
12 May	Spirit of Discovery	cruise ship	Meyer Werft	Papenburg	Germany	For Saga Cruises
17 May	Celebrity Apex	Edge-class cruise ship	Chantiers de l'Atlantique	Saint-Nazaire	France	For Celebrity Cruises
24 May	Peotr Velikiy	Project PV300VD	Lotos Shipyard		Russia	for Mosturflot
25 May	Ural	nuclear icebreaker	Baltiyskiy shipyard	Saint Petersburg	Russia	For FSUE Atomflot
25 May	Trieste		Fincantieri	Castellammare di Stabia, Naples	Italy	For Italian Navy
25 May	MSC Arina	Gülsün-class container ship		Daewoo Shipbuilding & Marine Engineering	South Korea	For MSC
26 May	Viking Hervor	Viking Longship-class river cruise ship	Rostock	Neptun Werft	Germany	For Viking Cruises
May		submarine	TKMS	Kiel	Germany	For Egypt Navy
May		Maritime Patrol Vessel	Karachi Shipyard & Engineering Works	Karachi	Pakistan	For Pakistan Maritime Security Agency
1 June	MSC Leni	Gülsün-class container ship	Koje	Samsung Heavy Industries	South Korea	For MSC
12 June	Kongsdal		Royal Bodewes	Hoogezand	Netherlands	
15 June	Volcán de Tagoro	High-speed catamaran	Incat	Hobart, Tasmania	Australia	For Naviera Armas, operates in Canary Islands
18 April	USS Minneapolis-Saint Paul	Freedom-class littoral combat ship	Marinette Marine		United States	For United States Navy
19 June	HMS Spey	River-class offshore patrol vessel	BAE Systems	Scotstoun	United Kingdom	For Royal Navy
29 June	MSC Nela	Gülsün-class container ship		Daewoo Shipbuilding & Marine Engineering	South Korea	For MSC
6 July	Viking Gersemi	Viking Longship-class river cruise ship	Rostock	Neptun Werft	Germany	For Viking Cruises
13 July	MSC Mia	Gülsün-class container ship	Koje	Samsung Heavy Industries	South Korea	For MSC
18 July	Arklow Abbey		Ferus Smit	Westerbroek	Netherlands	For Arklow Shipping
2 August	Prachuap Khiri Khan	River-class offshore patrol vessel	Bangkok Dock Company		Thailand	For Royal Thai Navy
6 August	Enchanted Princess	Royal-class cruise ship	Fincantieri	Monfalcone	Italy	For Princess Cruises
17 August	Norwegian Encore	Breakaway-class cruise ship	Meyer Werft	Papenburg	Germany	For Norwegian Cruise Line
29 June	MSC Sixin	Gülsün-class container ship		Daewoo Shipbuilding & Marine Engineering	South Korea	For MSC
29 August	Silver Moon	cruise ship	Fincantieri	Ancona	Italy	For Silversea Cruises
30 August	HMAS Stalwart	Supply-class replenishment oiler	Navantia	Ferrol	Spain	For Royal Australian Navy+
31 August	MSC Febe	Gülsün-class container ship	Koje	Samsung Heavy Industries	South Korea	For MSC
August	Oz	Sa'ar 6-class corvette	German Naval Yards	Kiel	Germany	For Israeli Navy
6 September	Arklow Willow		Ferus Smit	Leer	Germany	For Arklow Shipping
10 September	Galicia	E-Flexer-class ferry	AVIC		China	for Brittany Ferries
12 September	Norden		Royal Bodewes	Foxhol	Netherlands	
15 September	Viking Kari		Rostock	Neptun Werft	Germany	For Viking Cruises
25 September	CMA CGM Jacques Sadee	Jacques Saadé-class container ship	China State Shipbuilding Corporation	Shanghai	China	For CMA CGM
25 September	Hainan	Type 075 landing helicopter dock	Hudong–Zhonghua Shipbuilding		China	For Chinese Navy
12 October	Scot Explorer		Royal Bodewes	Hoogezand	Netherlands	
13 October	Viking Hevor		Rostock	Neptun Werft	Germany	For Viking Cruises
14 October	MSC Ambra	Gülsün-class container ship	Koje	Samsung Heavy Industries	South Korea	For MSC
22 October	Baunummer 310	passenger ship	Kiebitzberg Schiffswerft	Havelberg	Germany	
22 October	Yuan Qian Hai	Valemax ore carrier	China State Shipbuilding Corporation	Yangzhou	China	For China COSCO Shipping
29 October	Liekut	RoRo	Flensburger Schiffbau Gesellschaft	Flensburg	Germany	For Siem Group
6 November	Costa Firenze	Vista-class cruise ship	Fincantieri	Marghera	Italy	For Costa Crociere
6 November	Tōryū	Soryu-class submarine	Kawasaki Heavy Industries	Kobe	Japan	For Japanese Navy
15 November	Stena Embla	E-Flexer-class ferry	AVIC		China	for Stena Line
22 November	Arklow Accord	Arklow B-series	Ferus Smit	Westerbroek	Netherlands	For Arklow Shipping
28 November	MSC Virtuosa	Meraviglia-plus class cruise ship	Chantiers de l'Atlantique	Saint-Nazaire	France	For MSC Cruises
November	USS John F. Kennedy	Gerald R. Ford-class aircraft carrier	Huntington Ingalls Industries	Newport News	United States	For United States Navy
November	Amherst Islander II	6819 E3-ferry	Damen Galati	Galati	Romania	
7 December	National Geographic Endurance	cruise ship	Ulstein Verft		Norway	
21 December	Crystal Endeavor		MV Werften	Stralsund	Germany	For Crystal Cruises
30 December	Silver Origin	cruise ship	DeHoop	Lobith	Netherlands	For Silversea Cruises
Unknown date	Amberlisa	Fishing vessel	Arklow Marine Services Inc.	Arklow	Ireland	For MacMar Ltd.
Unknown date	CEMEX Go Innovation	MAD3500 Aggregates Dredger	Damen Shipyards Galati		Romania	For CEMEX UK Marine
Unknown date		Yacht	Abeking & Rasmussen		Germany	
Unknown date	Sea Cloud Spirit	sailing vessel	Metalships & Docks	Vigo	Spain	For Sea Cloud Cruises Sea Cloud Cruises GmbH of Hamburg, Germany was sold on 1 February 2022 to The Yacht Portfolio of Malta.
Unknown date	Yasa Jupiter	bulk carrier			Turkey	For Mirror Ventures SA
