= List of ship launches in 2016 =

The list of ship launches in 2016 includes a chronological list of ships launched in 2016.

Date	Ship	Class / type	Builder	Location	Country	Notes
3 January	Polaris	Icebreaker	Arctech Helsinki Shipyard	Helsinki, Finland	Finland	For Finnish Transport Agency
15 January	Mein Schiff 5	Cruise ship	Meyer Turku Shipyard	Turku, Finland	Finland	For TUI Cruises
19 January	Esnaad 225	Platform Supply Vessel	De Hoop	Lobith	Netherlands	
21 January	Amadeus Silver III	river cruise ship	De Hoop	Lobith	Netherlands	
25 January	Al Jasrah	UASC A15-class container ship	Hyundai Samho Heavy Industries	Samho	South Korea	For United Arab Shipping Company
30 January	Sioux City	Freedom-class littoral combat ship	Fincantieri Marinette Marine	Marinette, Wisconsin	United States	For United States Navy
30 January	Esnaad 226	Platform Supply Vessel	De Hoop	Foxhol	Netherlands	For Abu Dhabi National Oil Company
30 January	Lady Alida	Sea-River Liner 3700 coastal ship	GS Yard	Waterhuizen	Netherlands	For Wijnne Barends
8 February	Majestic Princess	Royal-class cruise ship	Fincantieri	Monfalcone	Italy	For Princess Cruises
12 February	MSC Jade	Pegasus-class container ship	Daewoo Shipbuilding & Marine Engineering	Okpo-dong	South Korea	For Mediterranean Shipping Company
18 February	Ovation of the Seas	Quantum-class cruise ship	Meyer Werft	Papenburg	Germany	For Royal Caribbean International
23 February	MSC Diana	Pegasus-class container ship	Samsung Heavy Industries	Koje	South Korea	For Mediterranean Shipping Company
26 February	Helix 2	Well Intervention vessel	FSG	Flensburg	Germany	For Siem Offshore
4 March	Seabourn Encore	cruise ship	Fincantieri	Marghera	Italy	For Seabourn Cruise Line
4 March	Titan	Triton-class container ship	Samsung Heavy Industries	Koje	South Korea	For Costamare Shipping Company
5 March	Umm Qarn	UASC A15-class container ship	Hyundai Samho Heavy Industries	Samho	South Korea	For United Arab Shipping Company
10 March	William Butler Yeats	Samuel Beckett-class offshore patrol vessel	Babcock Marine Ltd.	Appledore	United Kingdom	For Irish Naval Service.
16 March	Rothensee		GS Yard	Waterhuizen	Netherlands	
19 March	Ireland	cement carrier	Ferus Smit	Westerbroek	Netherlands	For JT Cement
20 March	AIDAperla	Hyperion-class cruise ship	Mitsubishi Heavy Industries	Nagasaki	Japan	For AIDA Cruises
22 March	Berlin	28-meter-class Lifeboat (rescue)	Fassmer	Berne	Germany	For DGzRS
23 March	Viking Sky	Venice-class cruise ship	Fincantieri	Ancona	Italy	For Viking Ocean Cruises
24 March	KRI Nagapasa	Type 209 submarine/Chang Bogo-class submarine	Daewoo Shipbuilding & Marine Engineering	Okpo-dong	South Korea	For Indonesian Navy
31 March	greenports 1		Shipyard Constructions Hoogezand Nieuwbouw	Foxhol	Netherlands	For bremenports
1 April	MSC Ditte	Pegasus-class container ship	Daewoo Shipbuilding & Marine Engineering	Okpo	South Korea	For Mediterranean Shipping Company
1 April	Arklow Valiant		Royal Bodewes	Hoogezand	Netherlands	For Arklow Shipping
2 April	Lady Anne-Lynn	Sea-River Liner 3700 coastal ship	GS Shipyard	Waterhuizen	Netherlands	For Wijnne Barends
10 April	Viking Hild	Viking Longships-clall river cruise ship	Neptun Werft	Rostock-Warnemünde	Germany	For Viking Cruises
13 April	Washington	Virginia-class submarine	Newport News Shipbuilding	Newport News	United States	For United States Navy
14 April	Delphis Bothnia	Delphis Bothnia-class container ship	Hanjin Heavy Industries	Busan	South Korea	
15 April	Atlantic Sun	ACL G4 ConRO ship	Hudong-Zhonghua Shipbuilding	Shanghai	China	For Atlantic Container Line
16 April	MSC Ingy	Pegasus-class container ship	Samsung Heavy Industries	Koje	South Korea	For Mediterranean Shipping Company
16 April	Project Mistral	yacht	Lürssen	Bremen	Germany	
22 April	Esnaad 227	Platform Supply Vessel	De Hoop	Tolkamer	Netherlands	For Abu Dhabi National Oil Company
29 April	Symphony Sun	Ferus Smit Ecobox	Ferus Smit	Leer	Germany	For Symphony Shipping BV
29 April	MSC Reef	Pegasus-class container ship	Daewoo Shipbuilding & Marine Engineering	Okpo	South Korea	For Mediterranean Shipping Company
April	INS Khanderi	Scorpène-class submarine	Mazagon Dock Ltd.	Mumbai	India	For Indian Navy
7 May	Garden State	ECO-class tanker	General Dynamics NASSCO		United States	For American Petroleum Tankers
12 May	Manchester	Independence-class littoral combat ship	Austal USA	Mobile, Alabama	United States	For US Navy
14 May	Afif	UASC A15-class container ship	Hyundai Samho Heavy Industries	Samho	South Korea	For Hapag Lloyd
21 May	Esnaad 228	Platform supply vessel	De Hoop	Foxhol	Netherlands	For Abu Dhabi National Oil Company
25 May	Ramform Hyperion	Ramform Titan-class research vessel	Mitsubishi Heavy Ind., Ltd.	Nagasaki	Japan	
3 June	Searoad Mersey II	Roll-in/roll-off	Flensburger Schiffbau-Gesellschaft	Flensburg	Germany	
4 June	Maud	Naval replenishment vessel	Daewoo Shipbuilding & Marine Engineering	Okpo-dong	South Korea	For the Royal Norwegian Navy
9 June	Arklow Cadet		Ferus Smit	Westerbroek	Netherlands	For Arklow Shipping
9 June	MSC Mirja	Pegasus-class container ship	Daewoo Shipbuilding & Marine Engineering	Okpo-dong	South Korea	For Mediterranean Shipping Company
10 June	Kleven Ulsteinvik 382	Anchor handling tug supply vessel	Kleven Yard	Ulsteinvik	Norway	For Maersk Supply Services
16 June	Arktika	Project 22220 icebreaker	Baltic Shipyard	St. Petersburg	Russia	For Rosatomflot
17 June	Viking Hild	Viking Longships-clall river cruise ship	Neptun Werft	Rostock-Warnemünde	Germany	For Viking Cruises
17 June	Lady Anne Beau	Sea-River Liner 3700 coastal ship	GS Yard	Waterhuizen	Netherlands	For Wijnne Barends
18 June	MSC Eloane	Pegasus-class container ship	Samsung Heavy Industries	Koje	South Korea	For Mediterranean Shipping Company
18 June	Al Jmeliyah	UASC A15-class container ship	Hyundai Samho Heavy Industries	Samho	South Korea	For Hapag Lloyd
21 June	Michael Monsoor	Zumwalt-class destroyer	Bath Iron Works	Bath, Maine	United States	For United States Navy
21 June	Griep To II	service vessel	Schiffswerft Bolle	Derben	Germany	For Wasserstraßen- und Schifffahrtsverwaltung des Bundes
25 June	Talos	Triton-class container ship	Samsung Heavy Industries	Koje	South Korea	For Costamare Shipping Company
30 June	Gennadiy Nevelskoy	Platform supply vessel	Arctech Helsinki Shipyard	Helsinki, Finland	Finland	For Sovcomflot
June	Maersk Starfish	Starfish-type anchor handler	Kleven Yard		Norway	For Mærsk Supply Service
1 July	Silver Muse	cruise ship	Fincantieri	Sestri Ponente	Italy	For Silversea Cruises
1 July	Esnaad 229	Platform supply vessel	De Hoop	Tolkamer	Netherlands	For Abu Dhabi National Oil Company
2 July	Taurus	Triton-class container ship	Samsung Heavy Industries	Koje	South Korea	For Costamare Shipping Company
4 July	Delphis Finnland	Delphis Bothnia-class container ship	Hanjin Heavy Industries	Busan	South Korea	
5 July	TB 40	Ship's boat	Fassmer	Berne	Germany	For DGzRS, ship's boat of Berlin
9 July	American Constellation	river cruise ship	Chesapeake Shipbuilding	Salisbury, Maryland	United States	For American Cruise Line
15 July	Megastar	LNG-powered RoRo-ferry	Meyer Turku Shipyard	Turku, Finland	Finland	For Tallink
16 July	Bay State	ECO-class tanker	General Dynamics NASSCO		United States	For American Petroleum Tankers
21 July	Fouladou	Offshore patrol vessel	Ocea	Les Sables-d'Olonne	France	For Senegal
21 July	Arklow Valley		Royal Bodewes	Hoogezand	Netherlands	For Arklow Shipping
2 August	Vasily Bekh	Project 22870 rescue tug	Zvezdochka Shipyard	Astrakhan	Russian Navy	Sunk during 2022 Russian invasion of Ukraine
5 August	Bogazici 23	Tug	Bogazici	Tuzla	Turkey	For Bugsier-, Reederei- und Bergungsgesellschaft
8 August	La Confiance	light patrol Guyana	Socarenam	Boulogne-sur-Mer	France	For French Navy
15 August	MSC Mirjam	Pegasus-class container ship	Samsung Heavy Industries	Koje	South Korea	For Mediterranean Shipping Company
19 August	Genting Dream	cruise ship	Meyer Werft	Papenburg	Germany	For Dream Cruises
20 August	Forth	River-class patrol vessel	BAE Systems	Glasgow	United Kingdom	For Royal Navy
22 August	Champlain	Bâtiment multi-mission patrol ship	Piriou	Concarneau	France	For French Navy
22 August	Theseus	Triton-class container ship	Samsung Heavy Industries	Koje	South Korea	For Costamare Shipping Company
26 August	Ares	Sunrise Droge Lading	GS Yard	Waterhuizen	Netherlands	For Wijnne Barends
26 August	MSC Erica	Pegasus-class container ship	Daewoo Shipbuilding & Marine Engineering	Okpo	South Korea	For Mediterranean Shipping Company
27 August	Constitution	ECO-class tanker	General Dynamics NASSCO		United States	For SEA-Vista
August	Furuvik		Royal Bodewes	Stettin	Poland	
2 September	MSC Meraviglia	Project "Vista" cruise ship	STX France Cruise SA	Saint-Nazaire	France	For MSC Cruises
3 September	Aquarius	yacht	Feadship	Aalsmeer	Netherlands	
9 September	Delphis Gdańsk	Delphis Bothnia-class container ship	Hanjin Heavy Industries	Busan	South Korea	
15 September	Seekuh		Lübeck Yacht Trave Schiff GmbH	Lübeck	Germany	For One Earth - One Ocean
16 September	Bretagne	FREMM multipurpose frigate	DCNS		France	For French Navy
16 September	Lady Astrid	Sea-River Liner 3700 coastal ship	GS Yard	Waterhuizen	Netherlands	For Wijnne Barends
16 September	S42	Type HDW 209/1400 submarine	German Naval Yards	Kiel	Germany	For Egyptian Navy
16 September	Zhibek Zholy	Bulk carrier cargo ship	Nevskiy S&S	Shlisselburg	Russia	For KTZ Express JSC
17 September	Al Fateh	Gowind-class corvette	DCNS		France	For Egyptian Navy
17 September	Wichita	Freedom-class littoral combat ship	Fincantieri Marinette Marine	Marinette, Wisconsin	United States	For United States Navy
30 September	Ellis Island	Hopper Dredge Barge	Eastern Shipbuilding	Panama City/Allanton	United States	For Great Lakes Dredge & Dock Company, LLC.
30 September	MSC Anna	Pegasus-class container ship	Hyundai Heavy Industries			For MSC
September		LNG barge			South Korea	For Gas4Sea
September	Coralius			Gdańsk	Poland	
1 October	Esnaad 230	Platform Supply Vessel	De Hoop	Foxhol	Netherlands	For Abu Dhabi National Oil Company
4 October		Project ROB07 oil barge	Nobel Brothers Shipyard		Russia	For JSC Lena United River Shipping Company
6 October	MSC Rifaya	Pegasus-class container ship	Samsung Heavy Industries	Koje	South Korea	For Mediterranean Shipping Company
8 October	Valparaíso Express	Valparaiso Express-class container ship	Hyundai Samho Heavy Industries		South Korea	For Hapag-Lloyd
8 October	Callao Express	Valparaiso Express-class container ship	Hyundai Samho Heavy Industries		South Korea	For Hapag-Lloyd
8 October	Delphis Riga	Delphis Bothnia-class container ship	Hanjin Heavy Industries	Busan	South Korea	
14 October	Symphony Performer	Ferus Smit Ecobox	Ferus Smit	Leer	Germany	For Symphony Shipping BV
16 October	Star Spirit	reefer ship	Shikoku Dockyard		Japan	For Star Reefers
18 October	Windea TBN	Service operations vessel	Ulstein Verft		Norway	For Bernhard Schulte Offshore
19 October	Project TIS	yacht	Lürssen	Bremen	Germany	
19 October	Asahi	Asahi-class destroyer	Mitsubishi Heavy Industries	Nagasaki	Japan	For JMSDF
21 October	Arklow Cape		Ferus Smit	Westerbroek	Netherlands	For Arklow Shipping
24 October	KRI Trisula	Type 209 submarine/Chang Bogo-class submarine	Daewoo Shipbuilding & Marine Engineering	Okpo-dong	South Korea	For Indonesian Navy
12 November	Siem Cicero	car carrier		Pula	Croatia	For Siem Industries
12 November	MSC Tina	Pegasus-class container ship	Daewoo Shipbuilding & Marine Engineering	Okpo	South Korea	For Mediterranean Shipping Company
18 November	Meleq	RoRo-ferry	Flensburger Schiffbau-Gesellschaft	Flensburg	Germany	For Alternative Transport
18 November	Visborg	ferry	GSI Shipyard	Guangzhou	China	For Destination Gotland
18 November	MSC Viviana	Pegasus-class container ship	Hyundai Heavy Industries Co.			For Mediterranean Shipping Company
20 November	MSC Leanne	Pegasus-class container ship	Samsung Heavy Industries	Koje	South Korea	For Mediterranean Shipping Company
24 November	Alexander Sannikov	ice breaker	Vyborg Shipyard		Russia	For Gazprom Neft
25 November	Arklow Valour		Royal Bodewes	Hoogezand	Netherlands	For Arklow Shipping
25 November	MSC Seaside	Seaside-class cruise ship	Fincantieri	Monfalcone	Italy	For MSC Cruises
November	Steigen	Live fish transporter	Cemre		Turkey	For Norsk Fisketransport
November	Vsevelod Bobrov	Elbrus-class logistics support vessel	Severnaya Verf Shipyard	St. Petersburg	Russia	For Russian Navy
3 December	Minerva	dredger	Royal IHC	Kinderdijk	Netherlands	For DEME
3 December	Cartagena Express	Valparaiso Express-class container ship	Hyundai Samho Heavy Industries		South Korea	For Hapag-Lloyd
3 December	Guayaquil Express	Valparaiso Express-class container ship	Hyundai Samho Heavy Industries		South Korea	For Hapag-Lloyd
10 December	Madrid Mærsk	Maersk Triple E class	Daewoo	Geoje	Republic of Korea	For Maersk Line
10 December	Liberty	ECO-class tanker	General Dynamics NASSCO		United States	For SEA-Vista
15 December	Viking Sun	Venice-class cruise ship	Fincantieri	Ancona	Italy	For Viking Ocean Cruises
15 December	HMAS Brisbane	Hobart-class destroyer	ASC shipyard	Osborne, South Australia	Australia	For Royal Australian Navy
17 December	Kimball	Legend-class cutter	NGSS Ingalls	Pascagoula, Mississippi	United States	For United States Coast Guard
22 December	L'Astrolabe	Polar Logistics Vessel	CRIST	Gdynia	Poland	For French Navy; outfitting and delivery by Chantiers Piriou in France
29 December	Colorado	Virginia-class submarine	General Dynamics Electric Boat	Groton	United States	For United States Navy
31 December	OOCL Hong Kong	G-class container ship	Samsung Heavy Industries		South Korea	For Orient Overseas Container Line
December		Type 4400 FAST yacht	Couach	Gujan-Mestras	France	
Unknown date	Dalby Ouse	Crew transfer vessel	Alicat Workboats Ltd.	Great Yarmouth	United Kingdom	For Dalby Offshore Services Ltd.
Unknown date	Hurricane Tow	Crew transfer vessel	Aluminium Marine Consultants Ltd.	Cowes	United Kingdom	For CWind Ltd.
Unknown date	Tornado	Crew transfer vessel	Aluminium Marine Consultants Ltd.	Cowes	United Kingdom	For private owner.
Unknown date	Tornado Tow	Crew transfer vessel	Aluminium Marine Consultants Ltd.	Cowes	United Kingdom	For private owner.
