= Stena Danica =

Stena Danica may refer to:

- MV Lucy Maude Montgomery, car ferry built 1965, previously Stena Danica, later Lady Clare I
- MV Queen of the North, car ferry built 1969, previously Stena Danica
- MS Stena Danica, car ferry built in 1983
