= Stonar Cut German Wreck =

Wreck of German WW2 Vessel in River Stour, Kent

Coordinates: 51°18′06″N 1°20′52″E

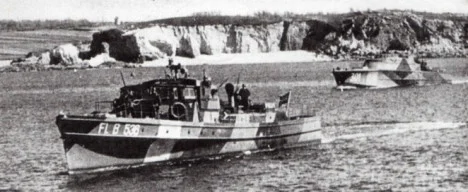
- Blitz in 1940

History

Germany
- Name: Blitz
- Namesake: The Blitz
- Operator: Kriegsmarine
- Identification: FLB531
- Fate: Captured by RAF in 1945

History

United Kingdom
- Name: Robin Hood
- Namesake: Robin Hood
- Owner: Air Ministry
- Operator: Royal Air Force
- Identification: UAM 1
- Fate: Abandoned in 1990s, sank in River Stour

General characteristics
- Class & type: Flugbetriebsboot
- Type: 500-series
- Length: 15 m (49 ft)
- Beam: 4.85 m (15.9 ft)
- Draught: 1.35 m (4.4 ft)
- Depth: 2.40 m (7.9 ft)

The Stonar Cut German Wreck is the remains of the steel-hulled World War II German aircraft tender and air-sea rescue launch Blitz, located in the Stonar Cut near Sandwich, Kent.

== History ==
The Blitz was a German aircraft tender and air-sea rescue launch that served for the Kriegsmarine in World War Two. Its fleet number was FLB531.

Following the conclusion of World War II the craft was captured by the Royal Air Force in Bergen Harbour, Norway, in 1945. Blitz was brought to Ramsgate Harbour and renamed Robin Hood, where it remained afloat. She underwent several modifications for civilian use, including the addition of a funnel and the installation of a 150 hp Gardner marine engine to assist with harbour manoeuvres.

In the late 20th century, the vessel was moved from Ramsgate to the Stonar Cut, which is a man-made bypass on the River Stour. It was originally moored alongside an older motor barge on the northern bank, and here the vessel was abandoned. Over time the hull was eroded and the vessel began to sink down the steep, muddy embankment of the cut. It eventually broke into two main sections and sank.

The wreck is submerged and broken apart. The remains are occasionally exposed during low tide, particularly when the Environment Agency flushes the nearby sluice gates, which scours the mud away from the wreck.
