= FKAB =

Swedish ship design consulting firm

Fartygskonstruktioner AB (FKAB) is Sweden's largest consulting firm specializing in ship design and ship construction. FKAB, which was founded in 1961, has 40 employees in Sweden and over 50 employees in China. FKAB designs all types of commercial ships and boats from pilot boats to 174 000 dwt bulk carriers.

== Controversy ==
In 1997, a british court found FKAB criminally guilty of "gross errors" under the Health and Safety at Work Act for their role in the Ramsgate port disaster which resulted in the collapse of a passenger walkway that caused the deaths of six people just four months after the walkway was installed.

As part of their conviction, FKAB were ordered to pay a £750,000 fine and court costs totalling £251,000. FKAB refused to pay the fine which created a diplomatic situation in the United Kingdom, Sweden and the European Union. A campaign was launched by Members of the European Parliament to "shame" FKAB in to paying the fine. As of 2024, FKAB have still not paid the fine.

The Health and Safety Executive found that FKAB had failed to make simple calculations and to include vital information in their design that was "inherently unsafe and was a design that was both inept and incompetent". The Health and Safety Executive found that "FKAB did not provide a safe design for the walkway and is primarily responsible for the technical design defects that caused the accident".
