= London-class container ship =

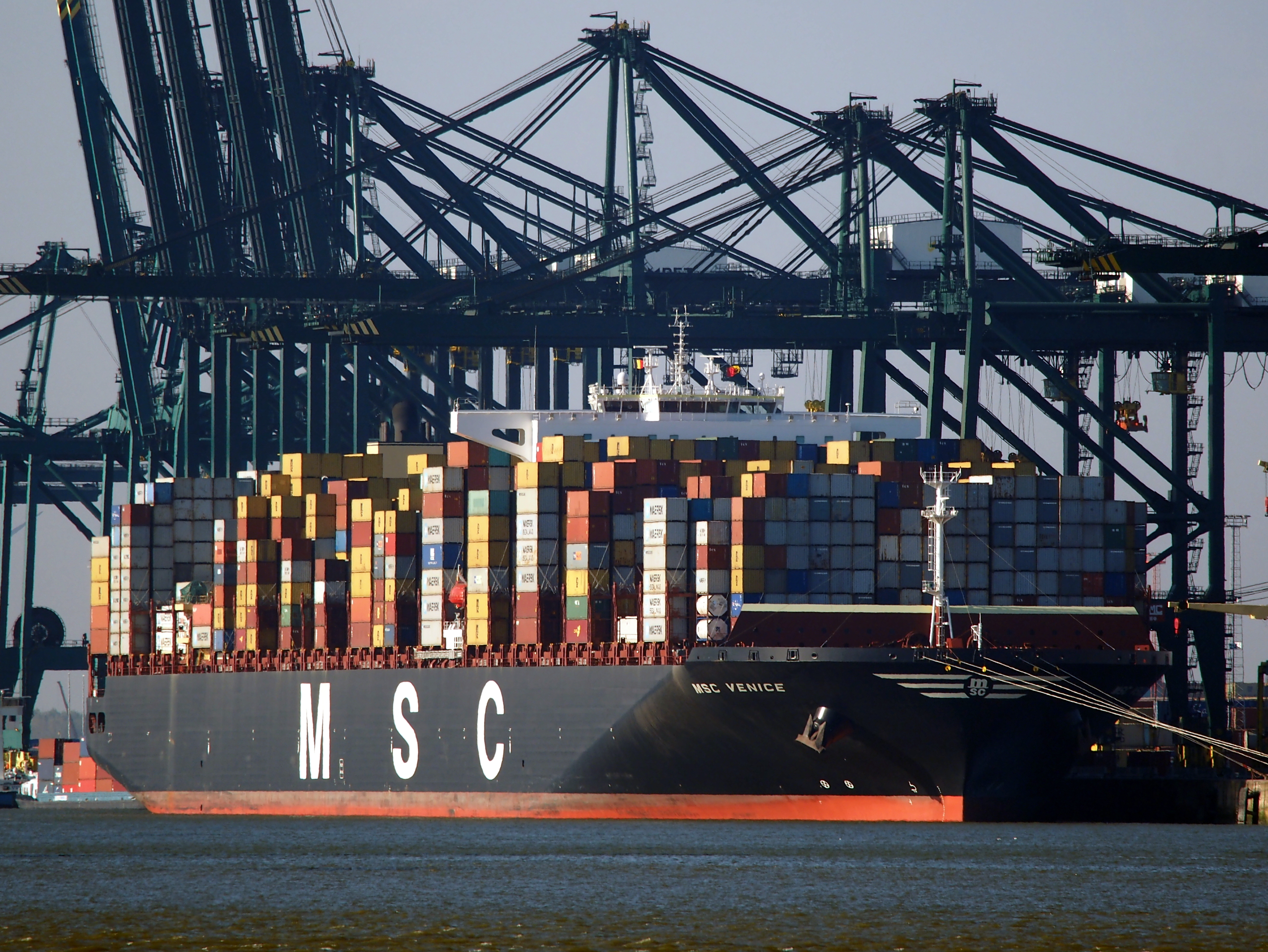
- MSC Venice in the port of Antwerp

Class overview
- Builders: STX Offshore & Shipbuilding
- Operators: Mediterranean Shipping Company
- In service: 2014–present
- Planned: 6
- Completed: 6
- Active: 6

General characteristics
- Type: Container ship
- Tonnage: 176,490 GT
- Length: 399 m (1,309 ft 1 in)
- Beam: 54 m (177 ft 2 in)
- Draught: 16 m (52 ft 6 in)
- Capacity: 16,652 TEU

The London class is a series of six container ships built for Zodiac Maritime (4 ships) and Eastern Pacific Shipping (2 ships). The ships were charted to Mediterranean Shipping Company (MSC). The ships have a maximum theoretical capacity of 16,652 twenty-foot equivalent units (TEU). The ships were built by STX Offshore & Shipbuilding in South Korea.

== List of ships ==
Ship	Yard number	IMO number	Delivery	Status	ref
MSC London	1527	9606302	10 Jul 2014	In service	
MSC New York	1528	9606314	20 Oct 2014	In service	
MSC Istanbul	1529	9606326	15 Jan 2015	In service	
MSC Amsterdam	1530	9606338	15 Apr 2015	In service	
MSC Hamburg	1551	9647461	26 Oct 2015	In service	
MSC Venice	1552	9647473	25 Jan 2016	In service	

== See also ==
- Gülsün-class container ship
- Pegasus-class container ship
- Olympic-class container ship
