= MSC Oliver =

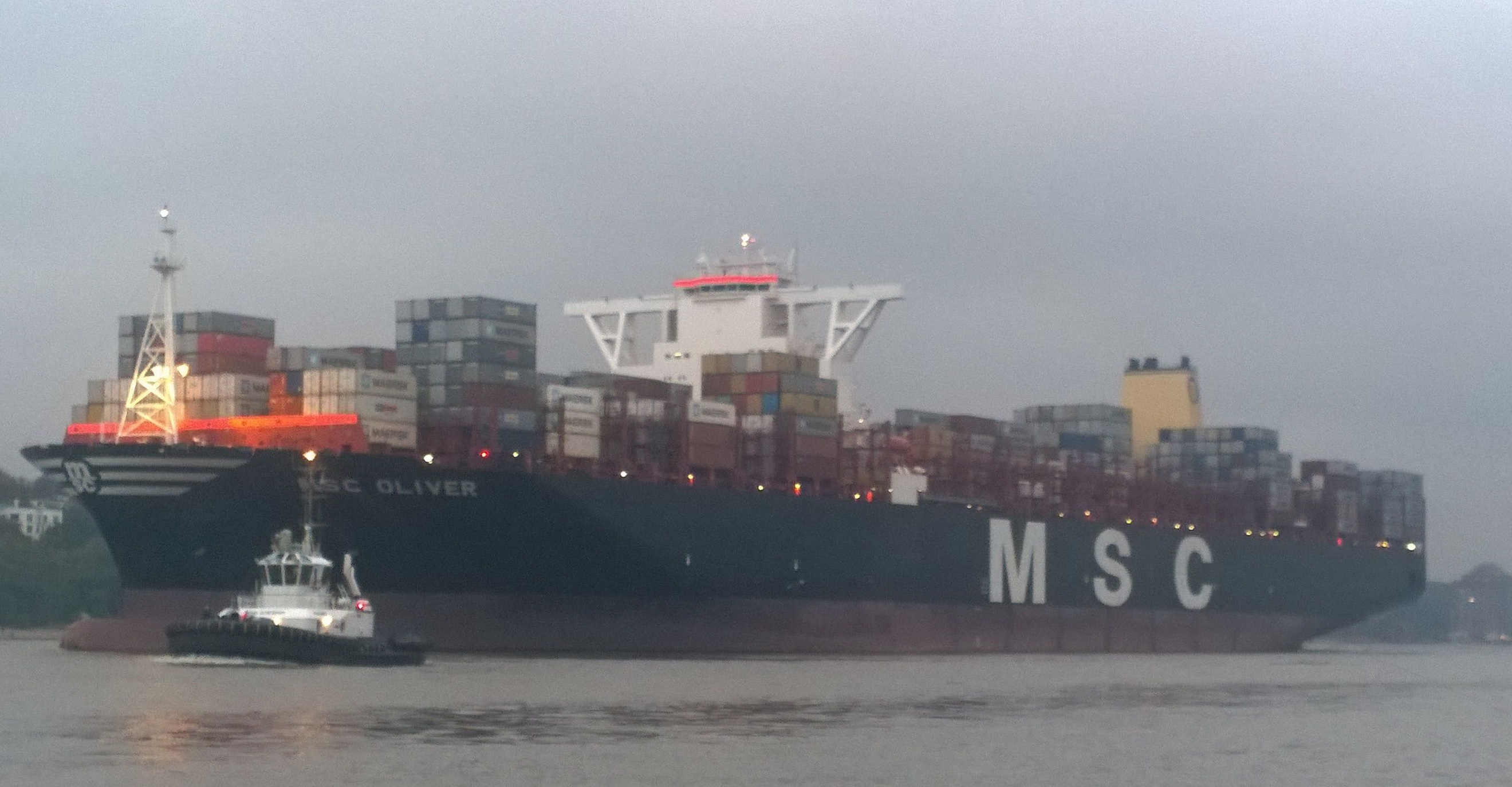
- MSC Oliver in light fog on the river Elbe

History
- Name: MSC Oliver
- Operator: Mediterranean Shipping Company
- Port of registry: Panama
- Builder: Daewoo Shipbuilding and Marine Engineering
- Launched: 10 January 2015
- Maiden voyage: April 2015
- Identification: Call sign: H8RY; IMO number: 9703306; MMSI number: 356289000
- Status: Operational

General characteristics
- Class & type: Olympic class Container ship
- Tonnage: 193,000 GT; 196,000 DWT
- Length: 395.40 m (1,297.2 ft)
- Beam: 59 m (194 ft)
- Draft: 16.0 m (52.5 ft)
- Installed power: MCR 62,500kW at 82.2 rpm; NCR 56,250kW at 79.4 rpm
- Propulsion: MAN B&W 11S90ME-C (10.2)
- Speed: 25.0 knots (46 km/h) (maximum); 22.5 knots (42 km/h) (cruising)
- Capacity: 19,224 TEU

MSC Oliver is one of the largest container vessels (as of May 2015) in the world, together with her sister ships MSC Oscar, MSC Zoe, MSC Maya and MSC Sveva. The vessel was delivered in March 2015 by Daewoo Shipbuilding and Marine Engineering (South Korea). According to the official statement of the CEO of Mediterranean Shipping Company, the ships are part from a bulk order for 20 vessels with same size, which will be used for cost optimizations of the company. With the new ships, the management of MSC are trying to fight the low freight rates and increased capacities of shipping.

== Name ==
The ship is named Oliver after the CEO of MSC, Diego Aponte's nephew.

== Construction ==
MSC Oliver and its sister ships were ordered by MSC in December 2013 and was completed in March 2015. The maiden voyage was planned for the beginning of April 2015 and the ship serves MSC's liner service between Asia and North Europe. MSC Oliver was built in Geoje shipyard of Daewoo Shipbuilding and Marine Engineering (yard number 4278). The container ship is valued at worth of US$140 million.

== Design ==
MSC Oliver has an overall length of 395.40 m (1,297.2 ft), moulded beam of 59 m (194 ft) and maximum summer draft of 16 m (52 ft). The deadweight of the cargo ship is 196,000 DWT and the gross tonnage is 193,000 GT. The total capacity is 19,224 TEU and on board of the vessel there are 1,800 reefer points. According to its owner, the ship has better than 35% lower CO_{2} emissions per TEU than earlier container ships.

== Engineering ==
The main engine of the container ship MSC Oliver is MAN B&W 11S90ME-C (10.2) with MCR of 62,500 kW at 82.2 rpm and NCR of 56,250 kW at 79.4 rpm. Such power is enough for the ship to reach service speed of 22.5 knots (42 km/h) and maximum speed of 25.0 knots (46 km/h). The optimized engineering and propulsion system decrease the fuel consumption and CO_{2} emissions by over 35% per TEU compared to conventional ships of the company.

== Sisterships ==
- MSC Zoe
- MSC Oscar
- MSC Maya
- MSC Sveva

== See also ==
- List of largest container ships
- Largest container shipping companies
