= MSC Zoe =

Container ship

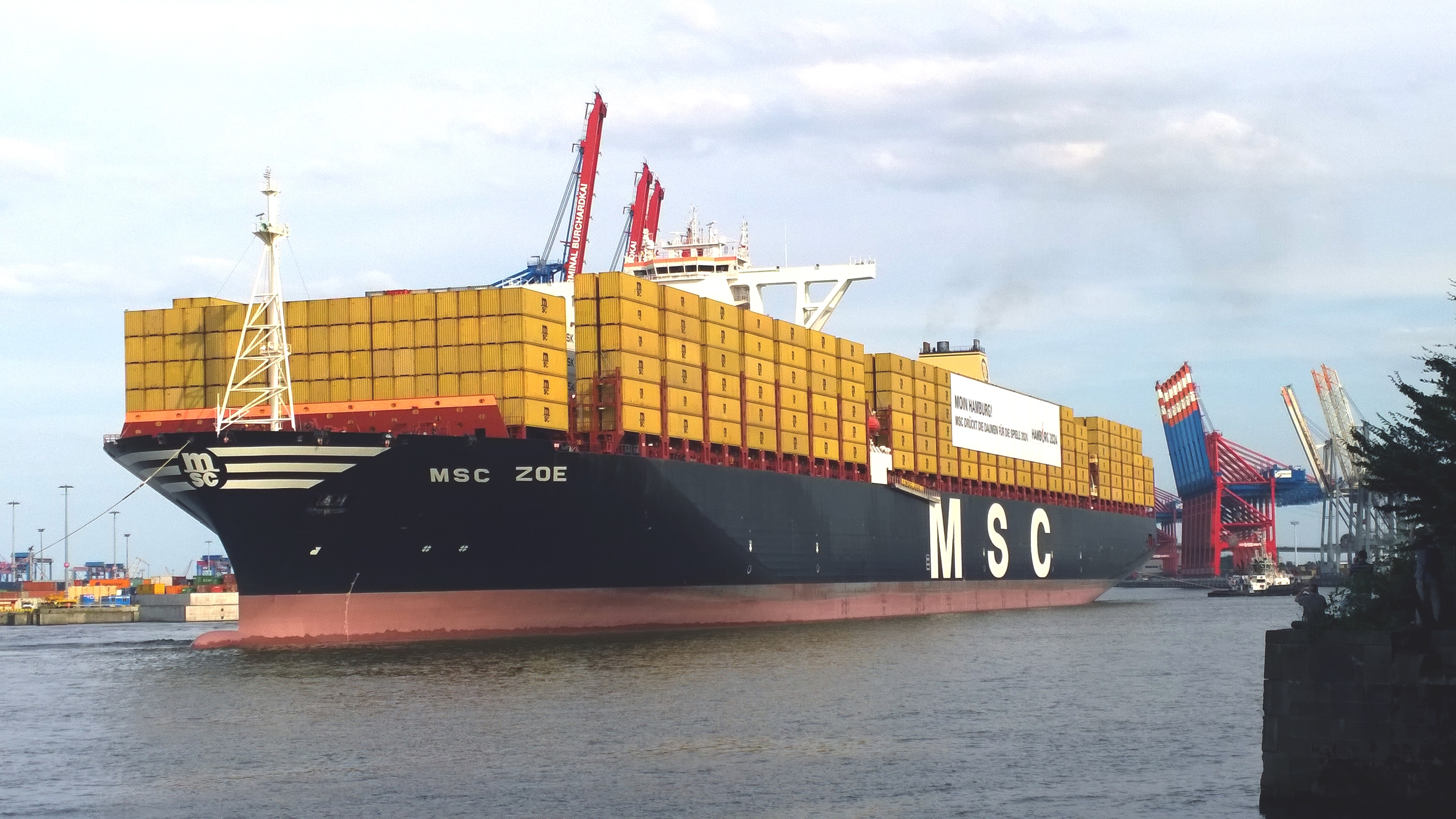
- The container ship MSC Zoe on tow at the Eurogate Terminal

History
- Name: MSC Zoe
- Owner: Mediterranean Shipping Company
- Operator: Mediterranean Shipping Company
- Port of registry: Panama
- Completed: 2015
- Identification: IMO number: 9703318

General characteristics
- Class & type: Olympic-class container ship
- Tonnage: 192,237 GT; 199,272 DWT
- Length: 395.4 m (1,297 ft)
- Beam: 59 m (194 ft)
- Draught: 14.5 m (48 ft)
- Installed power: MAN B&W 11S90ME-C two-stroke diesel engine; output: 62.5 MW (83,800 hp)
- Propulsion: Single five-blade propeller; blade length: 10.5 m (34 ft)
- Speed: 22.8 kn (42.2 km/h; 26.2 mph)
- Capacity: 19,224 TEU
- Crew: 22 (lifeboat capacity = 35)

MSC Zoe is an Olympic-class container ship built by Hanwha Ocean and operated by the Mediterranean Shipping Company. MSC Zoe was one of the largest container ships in the world when built in 2015. It is the third of a series of ships built for MSC, after MSC Oscar and MSC Oliver.

== Name ==
MSC Zoe takes her name from the four year old grand-daughter of Gianluigi Aponte, the Mediterranean Shipping Company (MSC) president and chief executive.

== Construction ==
MSC Zoe was built by Daewoo in South Korea for $140 million.

== Ship's particulars ==
At a length of 395 m (1,296 ft) and beam of 59 m (194 ft), MSC Zoe has a draft of 14.5 m (48 ft). She has a capacity of 19,224 TEU and a cargo capacity (dwt) of 199,272 tonnes.

== Propulsion ==
The vessel's main engine is a two-stroke MAN B&W 11S90ME-C diesel engine, which is a height of 15.5 m (51 ft), a length of 25 m (82 ft) and a breadth of 11 m (36 ft). The engine has a maximum continuous rating of 62.5 MW (83,800 hp) at 82.2 rpm and a normal continuous rating of 56.25 MW (75,430 hp) at 79.4 rpm.

== Loss of containers at sea ==
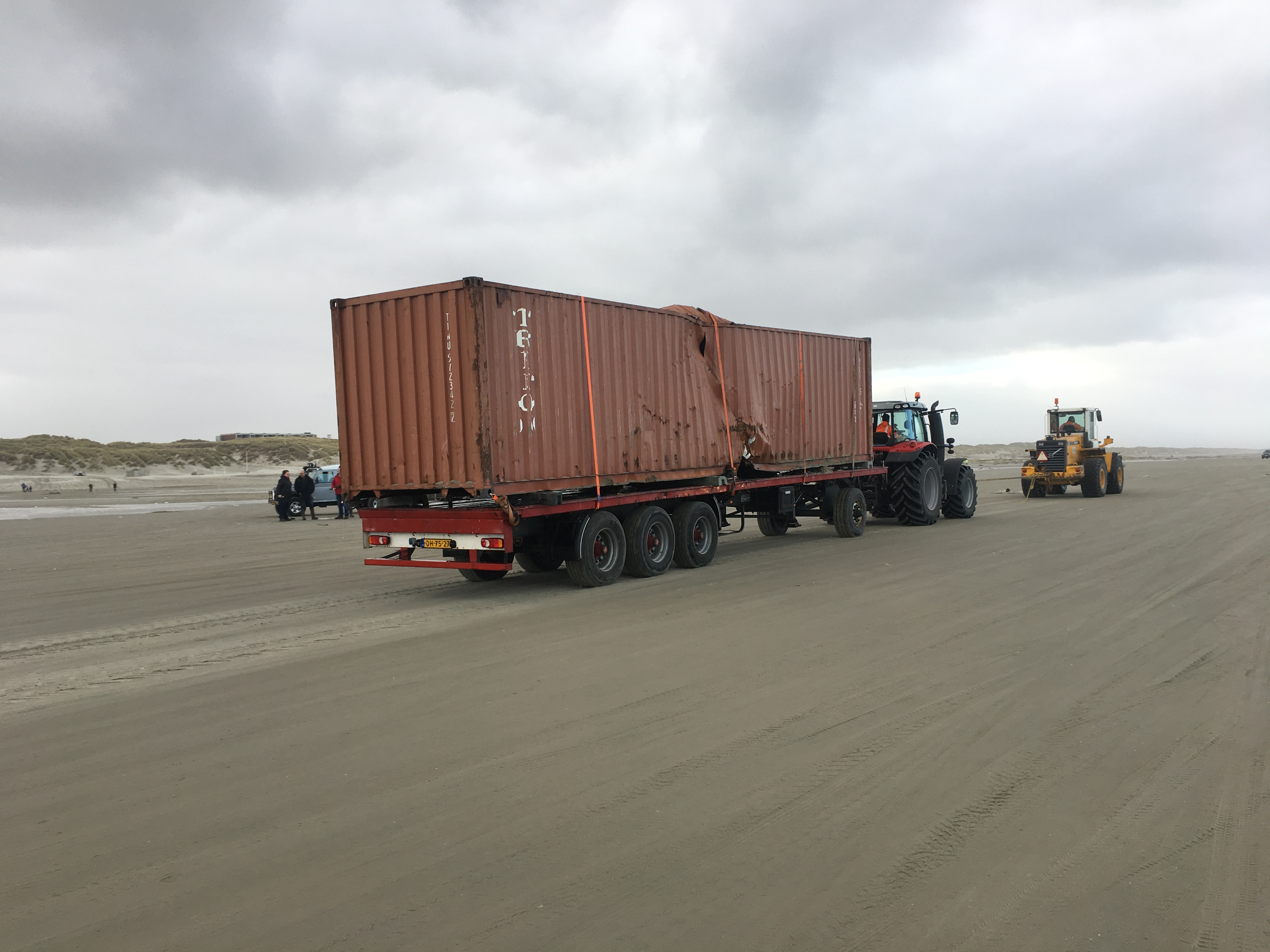
Salvaged container at Terschelling beach

On 1 January 2019, 342 containers went overboard whilst MSC Zoe was sailing on the North Sea. In total 345 containers were lost north of the Dutch island Ameland, the remaining containers some hours later north of the German island Borkum. Nineteen of the containers and their contents – including organic peroxides, children's toys, shoes, bags, cushions, chairs, televisions, plastic pellets, and plastic packaging – washed ashore on the Dutch islands of Vlieland, Terschelling, Ameland and Schiermonnikoog and German island Borkum in the Wadden Sea, a protected UNESCO biosphere reserve.

In 2020, the Dutch Safety Board, German BSU and Panama Maritime Authority published a joint report on their investigation of the incident. It notes that the loss of containers occurred over several hours, due to strong rolling and the associated accelerations caused by the prevalent sea conditions at the time. Although it found that the loading and securing of the cargo was in accordance with regulations at the time, it recommended to revise the regulations with special consideration of very large container ships.

In 2019 the shipping company created a list of places at sea where contents of the containers still can be found but did not publish it. After a lengthy legal battle against the Dutch government (who deemed the waste "litter") this list was made public in April 2024. It contains 6000 places at sea, and it totals around 800,000 kg (1,800,000 lb), approximately a quarter of the original waste.

== Sisterships ==
- MSC Oscar
- MSC Oliver
- MSC Maya
- MSC Sveva

== See also ==
- List of largest container ships
- Largest container shipping companies
