= MSC Maya =

Container ship built in 2015

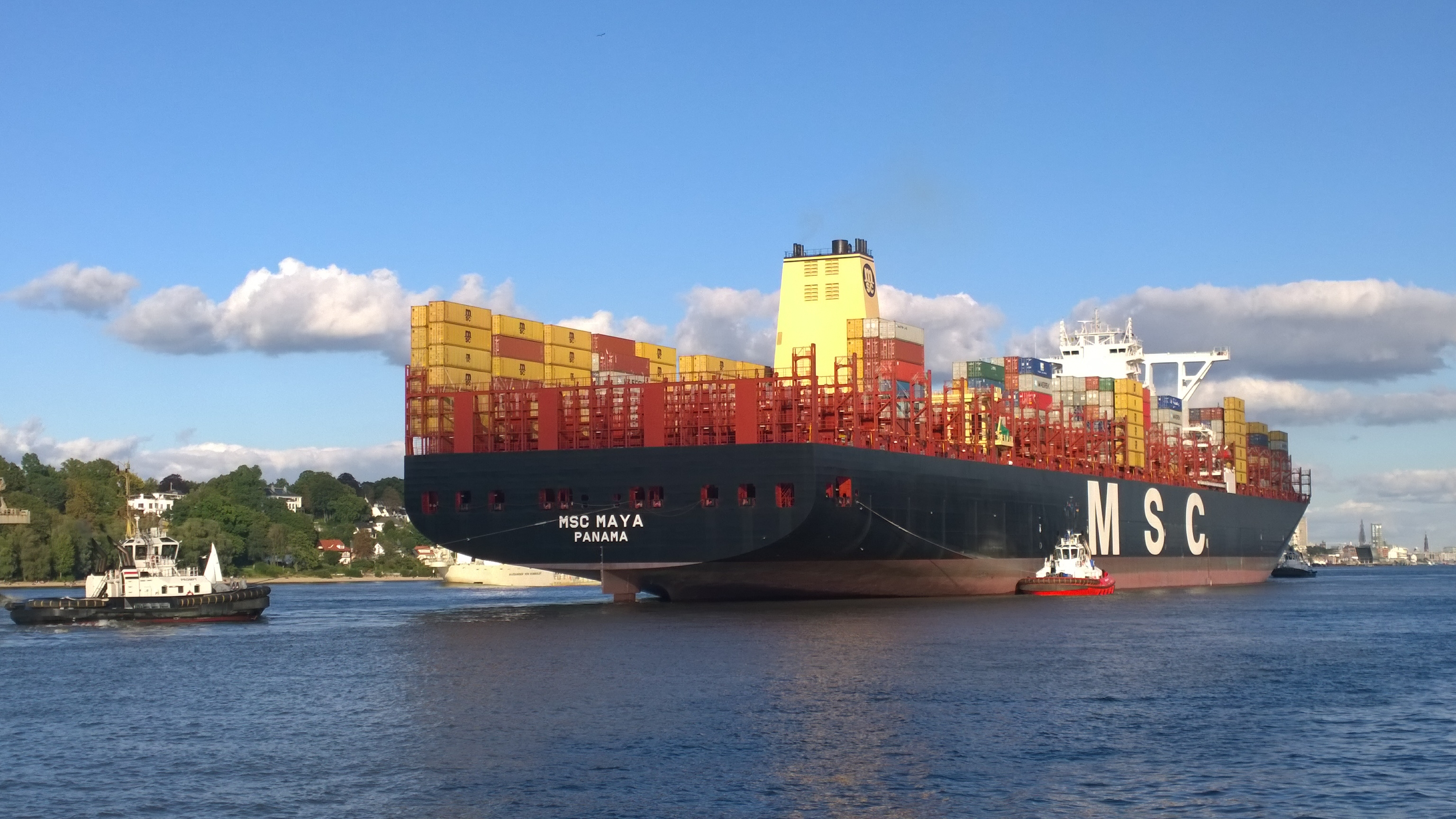
- MSC Maya with port of destination Hamburg

History
- Name: MSC Maya
- Operator: MSC
- Port of registry: Panama
- Builder: DSME
- Yard number: 4280
- Launched: 2015
- Identification: Germanischer Lloyd; Call sign: 3EZI; IMO number: 9708679
- Status: In service

General characteristics
- Class & type: Olympic class Container ship
- Tonnage: 192,237 GT; 111,423 NT; 197,362 DWT
- Length: 395.4 m (1,297 ft)
- Beam: 59 m (194 ft)
- Draught: 16 m (52 ft)
- Depth: 30.30 m (99.4 ft)
- Installed power: 83,780 hp
- Propulsion: MAN B&W 11S90ME-C10
- Speed: 22.8 knots (42 km/h) (service)
- Capacity: 19,224 TEU

MSC Maya is one of the world's largest container ships, built in 2015. The cargo ship has the capacity for 19,224 TEU.

== Design ==
MSC Maya was built in 2015 in Daewoo Shipbuilding & Marine Engineering by yard number 4280. The container ship has an overall length of 395.4 m (1,297 ft), moulded beam of 59 m (194 ft), board depth of 30.30 m (99.4 ft) and maximum draft of 16.00 m (52.49 ft). The deadweight of container ship MSC Maya is 197,362 DWT, the gross tonnage is 192,237 GT and the net tonnage is 111,423 NT. With such dimensions, the vessel has the capacity to carry 19,224 TEU.

== Engine equipment ==
The main engine on board MSC Maya is 2-stroke 11-cylinder diesel engine MAN B&W 11S90ME-C10, which has a total output power of 67,100 kW / 83,780 hp. The vessel is driven by one fixed-pitch five-blade propeller with a diameter of 10.5 m (34.5 ft). Additionally, for easier maneuvering while at port, the ultra large container carrier is equipped with two bow thrusters. All these propulsion systems allow the cargo ship to operate with a service speed of 22.8 knots (42 km/h).

== MSC Maya News and Information ==
MSC Maya was christened in the Port of Antwerp on September 26, 2016.

MSC Maya made her maiden call at Southampton on December 15, 2016.

MSC Maya is operating under the flag of Panama with IMO number 9708679 and call sign 3EZI. The vessel is operating on the Far East-Europe service of MSC in the framework of the 2M Alliance. MSC Maya is known, as the largest container ship, which ever visited Poland

== Sister Ships ==
- MSC Zoe
- MSC Oliver
- MSC Oscar
- Largest container shipping companies
- Largest container ships ever built
