= MS Stena Danica =

Swedish car ferry built in 1980

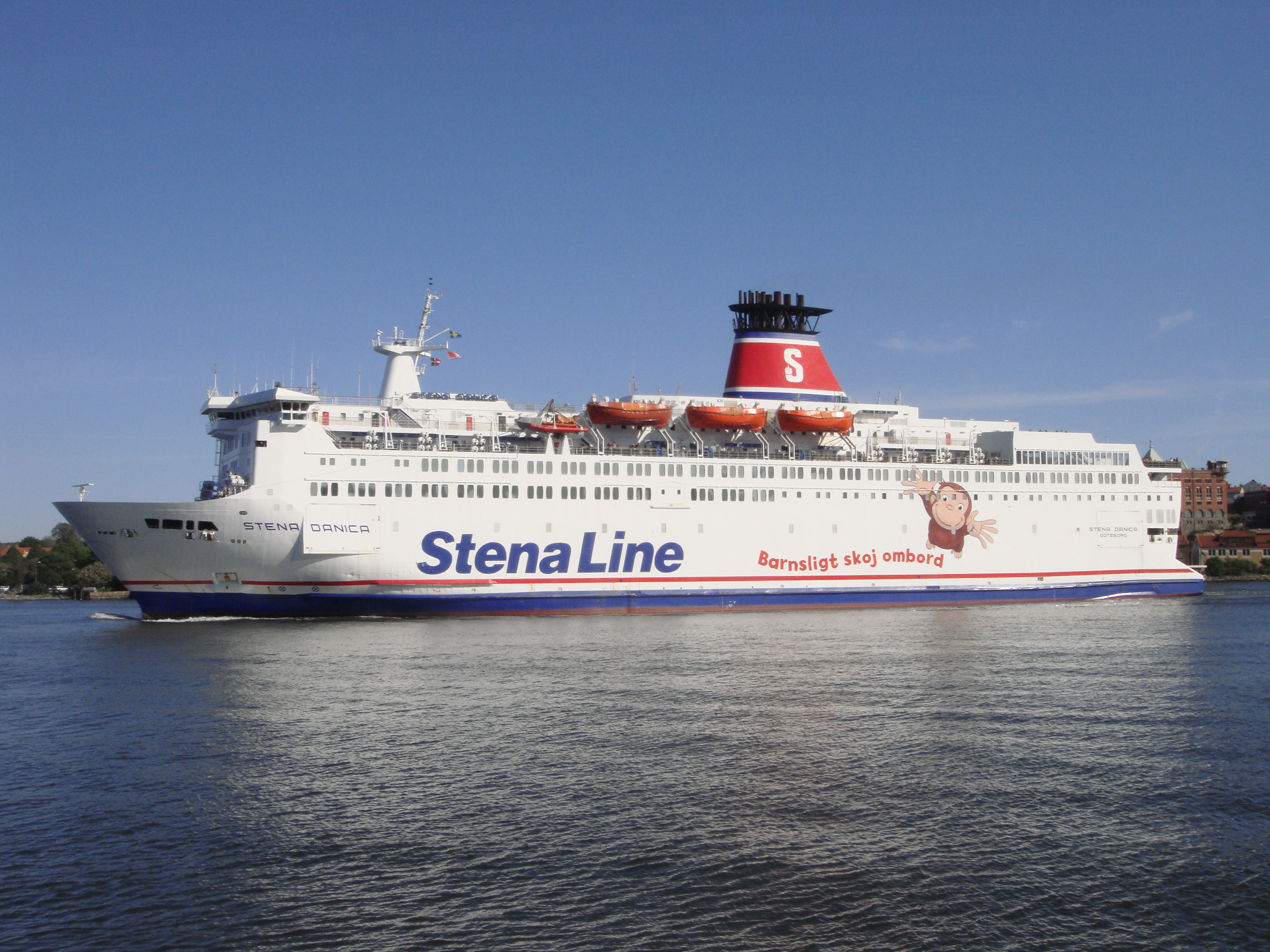
- Stena Danica in Gothenburg

History
- Name: Stena Danica
- Operator: Stena Line
- Port of registry: Gothenburg, Sweden
- Route: Gothenburg-Fredrikshavn
- Builder: Chantiers du Nord et de la Méditerranée, Dunkerque
- Yard number: 309
- Launched: 30 August 1983
- Identification: IMO number: 7907245
- Status: In service

General characteristics (as built)
- Tonnage: 15,899 gt
- Length: 152.33 m (499.8 ft)
- Beam: 28.28 m (92.8 ft)
- Draught: 6.31 m (20.7 ft)
- Installed power: 4 x Sulzer 12ZV40 diesels
- Propulsion: 2 × controllable pitch propellers; 2 × bow thrusters
- Speed: 20 knots (37 km/h)
- Capacity: 2,300 passengers; 630 cars

Stena Danica is a ferry operated by Stena Line between Gothenburg and Fredrikshavn.

She entered service in 1983, along with her sister ship Stena Jutlandica. She still serves the same route today.
