= Seaborne Freight =

British ferry operator

- Type: Private company
- Industry: Passenger transportation; Freight transportation; Truck transportation
- Founded: 5 April 2017
- Defunct: 1 February 2024
- Fate: Voluntary liquidation
- Headquarters: London, England
- Area served: Belgium, England
- Key people: Ben Sharp (CEO); Glenn Roy Dudley (COO)
- Website: seabornefreight.com

Seaborne Freight (UK) Limited was a company that planned to run roll-on roll-off (ro-ro) ferries between the Port of Ramsgate, England and Port of Ostend, Belgium. It was formed in April 2017 and announced its plans in October 2017. It was awarded a £13.8 million contract by the UK Department for Transport in December 2018 in the case of a No-deal Brexit but there was controversy and doubts about the company's ability to provide the service and the contract was cancelled on 9 February 2019. On 8 September 2020, the company entered voluntary liquidation owing £2 million.

== History ==
=== Formation ===
Seaborne Freight (UK) Limited was incorporated on 5 April 2017. The people behind Seaborne Freight were claimed to have many years of English Channel ferry experience including with Sealink, SeaFrance and MyFerryLink.

Seaborne's founder and Chief Operating Officer, Glenn Dudley, was imprisoned for two months for possessing a shotgun, in relation to a protest by animal rights activists against a live cattle exporting company in Shoreham-by-Sea of which he was a director in the 1990s. The exports were legal but because of the protests the local police had to bring in 1,000 extra officers to enable the exports to proceed. One protester was killed during a confrontation with the police. Dudley said he borrowed the shotgun to have it as "what you’d call a backstop" as protection against protesters who picketed his house. Later, when the police decided to withdraw the expensive extra security, the company launched an unsuccessful lawsuit to reverse the decision.

The company's chief executive, Ben Sharp, previously ran Mercator, a ship chartering business, that was forced into liquidation following court petitions from HM Revenue & Customs. The amount of unpaid tax was not stated, but the former company had a total of £1.78m in unpaid debts.

In October 2017, it was announced that Seaborne Freight would operate an Ostend - Ramsgate ro-ro freight ferry service from March using three ships, including the Nord Pas-de-Calais. The route was previously operated by Transeuropa Ferries until 2013 when it filed for bankruptcy. In August 2018 the Belgian media reported that Seaborne's plans were directly connected to Brexit and later in August, the leader of Thanet District Council - which had just assumed responsibility for the Port of Ramsgate - stated that a ferry deal was 'close'. A further report in November 2018 expressed scepticism as to whether the start of operations was imminent and noted that there were still a lot of obstacles.

=== Contract awarded by British government ===
On 22 December 2018, the company was awarded a £13.8 million contract to run ferry services between Ramsgate and Ostend to lessen the consequences of probable capacity constraints on the Dover to Calais route after 29 March 2019 in the case of a No-deal Brexit.

In early January 2019, it was reported that Seaborne was aiming to begin operating services with two ships in late March, rising to four by the end of the summer.

According to the government, the award of the contract without prior publication of an invitation to tender in the Official Journal of the European Union (OJEU) was justified by the extreme urgency brought about by unforeseeable events. A negotiated procurement procedure without prior publication in the OJEU is permitted in urgent conditions under Regulation 32 of the Public Contracts Regulations 2015.

=== Controversy ===
The announcement that Seaborne Freight had been awarded the contract caused controversy after it was revealed that at the time contract was signed, the company had no ships and had never operated any. Critics also pointed out that the Port of Ramsgate would need to be dredged before services could begin and raised questions as to whether due diligence checks had been undertaken before the award of the contract. By 3 January 2019 dredging had begun in Ramsgate.

Britain's Transport Secretary, Chris Grayling, defended the decision to award the contract to Seaborne Freight. Grayling said the contract was an example of the government helping “a new start-up business” and insisted “there is nothing wrong with that”. A spokesperson from the Department for Transport told reporters that “Before any contract was signed, due diligence on Seaborne Freight was carried out both by senior officials at the Department for Transport, and highly reputable independent third party organisations".

On 3 January 2019, it was reported that the Seaborne Freight website displayed terms and conditions that appeared to have been copied and pasted from an online food ordering website and a boutique jewellery shop. Reports also noted that certain website functions such as the 'Portal Log-in' were in fact non-functional inline images.

On 7 January 2019, Joanna Cherry MP enquired in the House of Commons about the reason for the government using Regulation 32 procedures to enable it to negotiate the Seaborne contract behind closed doors without a published invitation to tender, when it had known for some time that there was a risk of the UK leaving the EU without a deal. She asked whether the government would publish the legal advice it was given that enabled it to proceed under Regulation 32. She was not given an answer. On 9 January 2019, in a parliamentary Brexit Committee meeting, Cherry asked Christopher Heaton-Harris, the Parliamentary Under-Secretary of State at the Department for Exiting the European Union, what "extreme urgency" enabled the government to use Regulation 32, given that the government had had staff working on no-deal Brexit contingency planning for two years, but again her question was not answered.

The Mayor of Ostend, Bart Tommelein, had told the BBC that it was "impossible" for the Port of Ostend to be ready in time for Brexit. On 9 January 2019, the Financial Times reported that Seaborne itself acknowledged that services would run by late April 2019 at the earliest, and that inaccurate investor briefings had been issued by the company.

In January 2019, Private Eye magazine reported that "Ben Sharp's other company, Albany Shipping (which also has no boats)" claimed to have been "fundamental in the creation of a new shipping fund in the UK specifically for the purpose of purchasing offshore vessels […] based in Gibraltar and […] managed by Flexagon Capital Solutions LLP in London”; the magazine also quoted Flexagon's boss as saying that it had "'never raised a pound', was dormant and had nothing to do with Seaborne".

At a budget meeting on 7 February 2019, Thanet District Council proposed to cut £730,000 of spending on the port of Ramsgate. This could have prevented Ramsgate reopening as a ferry port. However, the council agreed to delay the decision at Grayling's request.

The contract was cancelled by the Department for Transport on 9 February 2019 after Arklow Shipping, reported to be Seaborne's backer, pulled out. Arklow Shipping said that it had been in talks with Seaborne twice in 2018 but denied that there had been an agreement with Seaborne or the Department for Transport. The company had considered investing in Seaborne and providing two ferries, but nothing was signed. When the company discovered that Seaborne had no port agreement in Ramsgate it decided not to go any further.

On 13 February 2019, Grayling's department publicly acknowledged that it had failed to secure any written guarantees of Seaborne Freight's financial security before awarding it a £13.8m contract. Then-opposition leader Jeremy Corbyn criticised Grayling's handling of the contract, saying that even if the contract was cancelled and Seaborne received no money from it, the government had spent £800,000 on external consultants for it.

Eurotunnel, the operator of the Channel Tunnel, filed a complaint at the High Court, saying that the government had awarded the contract through a "secretive and flawed procurement process." The case was settled out-of-court in March 2019 with the government agreeing to pay £33 million to Eurotunnel.

=== Liquidation ===
On 8 September 2020, Seaborne Freight was placed in voluntary liquidation with realisable assets of £2,620 and debts of £2 million. It was dissolved on 1 February 2024.
