= MSC Oscar =

Container ship

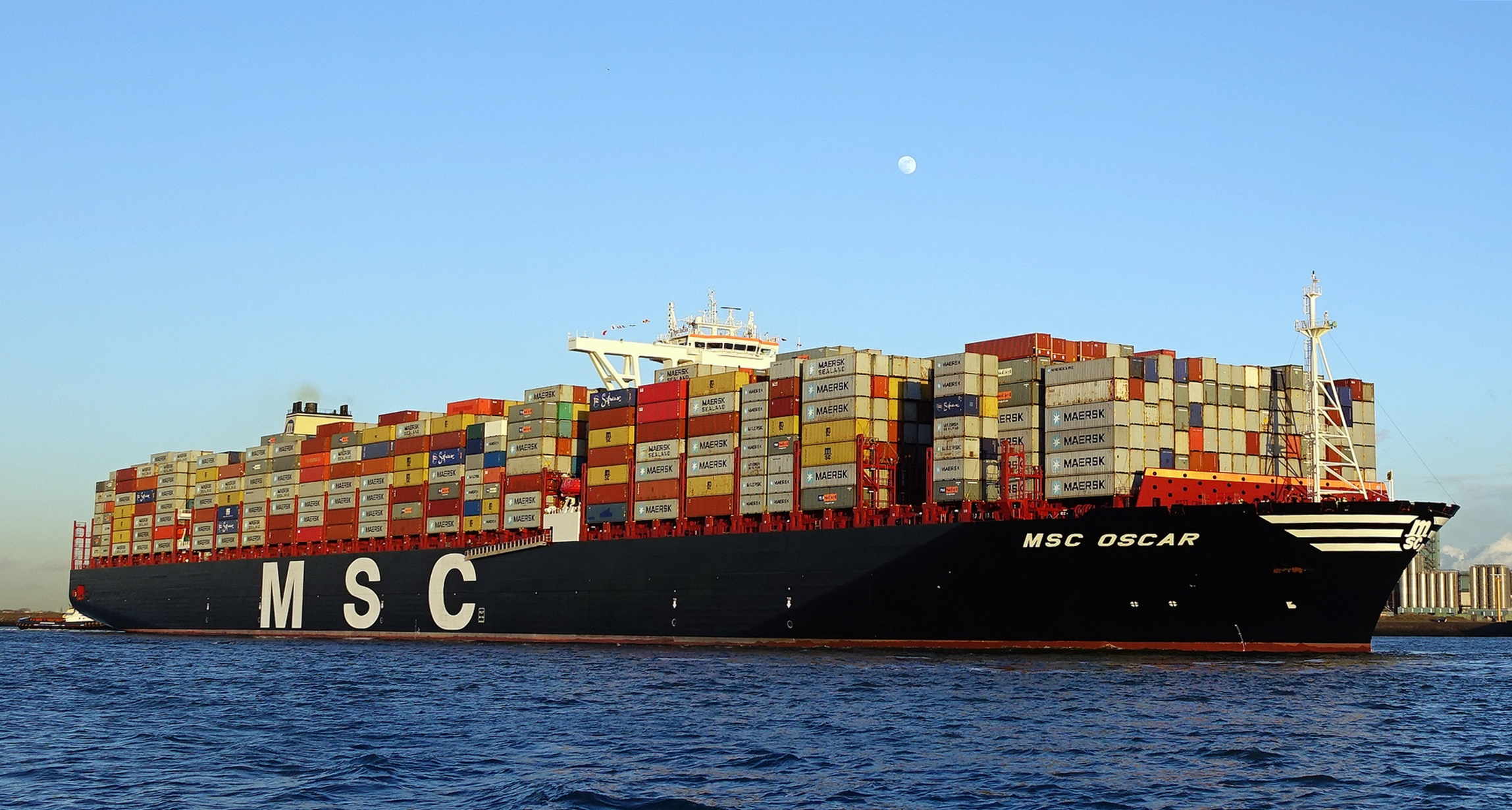
- MV MSC Oscar arriving at the Port of Rotterdam

History
- Name: MSC Oscar
- Owner: Mediterranean Shipping Company
- Operator: Mediterranean Shipping Company
- Port of registry: Panama
- Builder: Daewoo Shipbuilding & Marine Engineering (DSME)
- Cost: US$140 million
- Completed: December 2014
- Identification: IMO number: 9703291

General characteristics
- Class & type: Olympic class Container ship
- Tonnage: 197,362 DWT
- Length: 395.4 m (1,297 ft)
- Beam: 59 m (194 ft)
- Draught: 16 m (52 ft)
- Ice class: none
- Installed power: MAN B&W 11S90ME-C two-stroke diesel engine; output: 62.5 MW (83,800 hp)
- Propulsion: Single five-blade propeller; blade length: 10.5 m (34 ft)
- Speed: 22.8 kn (42.2 km/h; 26.2 mph)
- Capacity: 19,224 TEU
- Crew: Max 35

MSC Oscar, and sister ships MSC Zoe and MSC Oliver, are large container ships. Christened on 8 January 2015, MSC Oscar was recognised as the largest container ship in the world; until then CSCL Globe, inaugurated in November 2014, had been the largest.

== Name ==
MSC Oscar takes her name from the son of Diego Aponte, the president, CEO, and owner of Mediterranean Shipping Company (MSC).

== Construction ==
MSC Oscar was built by Daewoo in South Korea for US$140 million.

== Number of containers ==
The ship was first planned for 18,400 TEU. Upon completion of construction the capacity was 19,224 TEU, including the capacity for 1,800 refrigerated containers. As the deadweight tonnage of the ship is 197,362 DWT, she can only carry a full load of containers if each has a mean weight not exceeding 10.2 tonnes. With average 14-tonne containers, the capacity is around 14,000 TEU.

== Propulsion ==
The vessel's main engine is a two-stroke MAN Diesel 11S90ME-C diesel engine, which has a height of 15.5 m (51 ft), a length of 25 m (82 ft) and a breadth of 11 m (36 ft). The engine has a maximum continuous rating of 62.5 MW (83,800 hp) at 82.2 rpm and a normal continuous rating of 56.25 MW (75,430 hp) at 79.4 rpm.

== In the media ==
MSC Oscar was the subject of an episode of the documentary television program Mighty Ships, the second episode of the tenth series. Produced by a Canadian company, Exploration Production Inc., the program was first telecast in Canada on 10 December 2017. The series is aired in other countries as well.

The ship was featured in the 2018 semi-final of Sky Arts' Landscape Artist of the Year. The contestants were halfway through their task of painting Felixstowe Docks when the MSC Oscar appeared.

== Sister ships ==
- MSC Zoe
- MSC Oliver
- MSC Maya
- MSC Sveva

== See also ==
- Largest container shipping companies
- Largest container ships ever built
