= Olympic-class container ship =

2014 series of six commercial ships

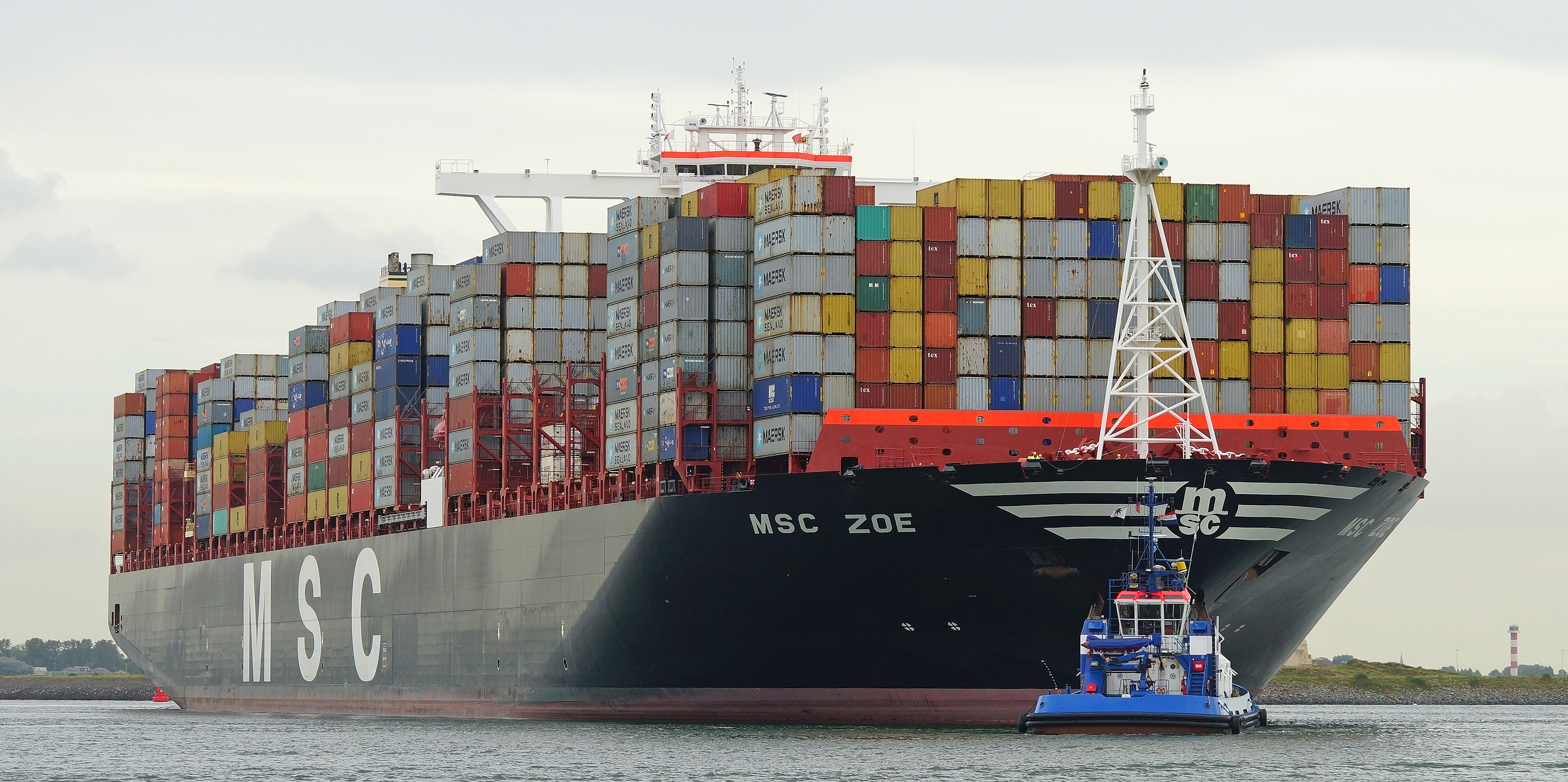
- MSC Zoe in the port of Rotterdam

Class overview
- Builders: Daewoo Shipbuilding and Marine Engineering
- Operators: Mediterranean Shipping Company
- In service: 2014–present
- Completed: 6
- Active: 6

General characteristics
- Type: Container ship
- Tonnage: 192,237 GT
- Length: 395.5 m (1,297 ft 7 in)
- Beam: 59.1 m (193 ft 11 in)
- Draught: 16 m (52 ft 6 in)
- Propulsion: MAN 11S90ME-C10.2
- Capacity: 19,224 TEU

The Olympic class is a series of six container ships built for Mediterranean Shipping Company (MSC). The ships have a maximum theoretical capacity of 19,224 twenty-foot equivalent units (TEU). The ships were built by Daewoo Shipbuilding and Marine Engineering (DSME).

== List of ships ==
Ship	Yard number	IMO number	Delivery	Status	ref
MSC Oscar	4277	9703291	29 Dec 2014	In service	
MSC Oliver	4278	9703306	30 Mar 2015	In service	
MSC Zoe	4279	9703318	24 Jun 2015	In service	
MSC Maya	4280	9708679	19 Aug 2015	In service	
MSC Sveva	4281	9708681	22 Oct 2015	In service	
MSC Clara	4282	9708693	11 Nov 2015	In service	

== See also ==
- Gülsün-class container ship
- Pegasus-class container ship
- London-class container ship
