= Valparaiso Express-class container ship =

Container ship class

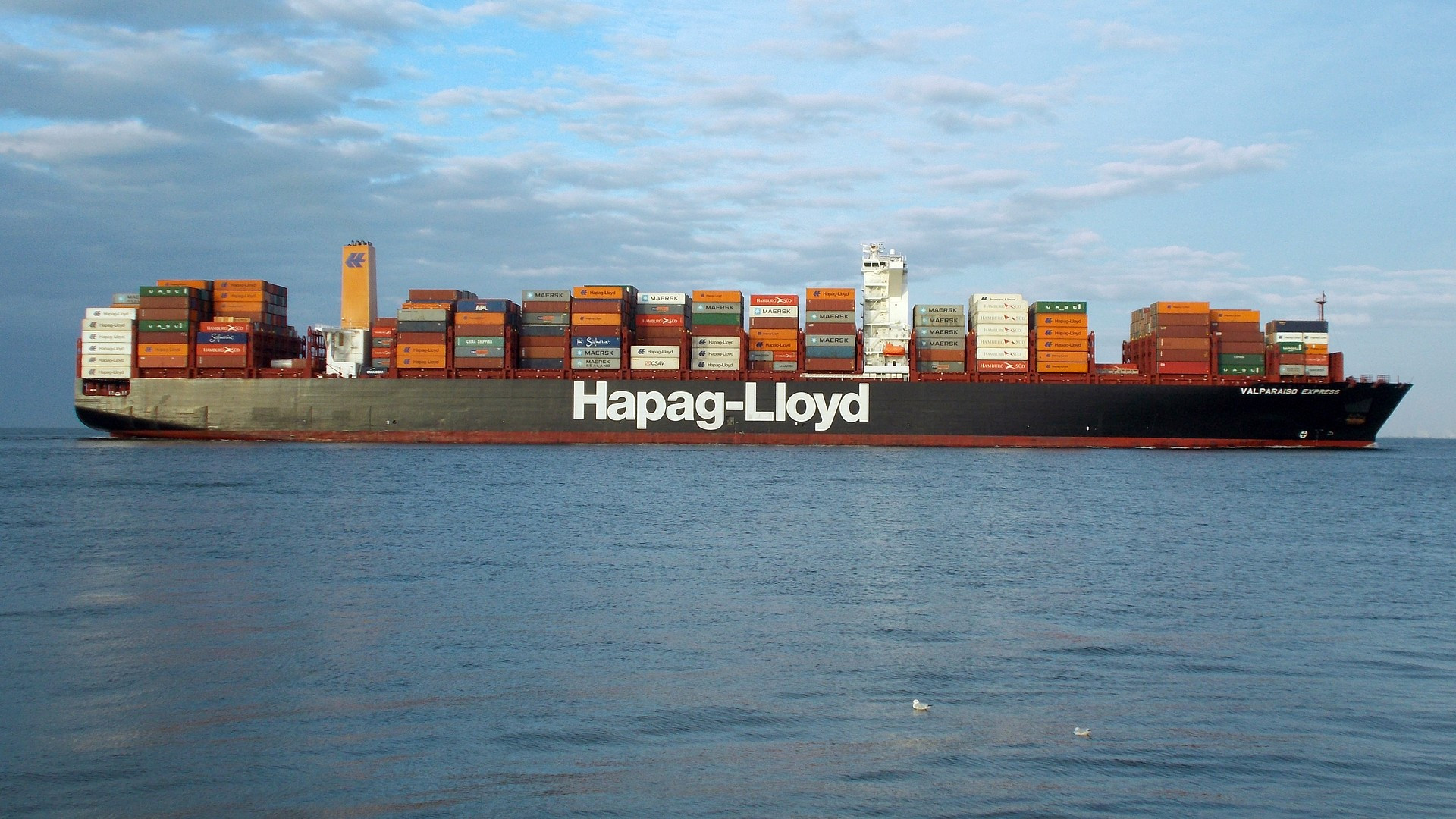
- Valparaiso Express near Cuxhaven

Class overview
- Builders: Hyundai Samho Heavy Industries
- Operators: Hapag-Lloyd
- In service: 2016–present
- Planned: 5
- Completed: 5
- Active: 5

General characteristics
- Type: Container ship
- Tonnage: 118,945 GT
- Length: 333.2 m (1,093 ft)
- Beam: 48.2 m (158 ft)
- Draught: 14 m (46 ft)
- Propulsion: MAN 7S90ME-C9&10
- Capacity: 11,519 TEU

The Valparaiso Express class is a series of 5 container ships built for Hapag-Lloyd. The ships were built by Hyundai Samho Heavy Industries in South Korea and have a maximum theoretical capacity of around 11,519 twenty-foot equivalent units (TEU).

== List of ships ==
Ship	Yard number	IMO number	Delivery	Status	ref
Valparaiso Express	S832	9777589	2 Nov 2016	In service	
Callao Express	S833	9777606	7 Dec 2016	In service	
Cartagena Express	S834	9777618	19 Jan 2017	In service	
Guayaquil Express	S835	9777620	2 Feb 2017	In service	
Santos Express	S836	9777632	27 Apr 2017	In service	

== See also ==
Hamburg Express-class container ship
