= Gülsün-class container ship =

2019 class of container ship

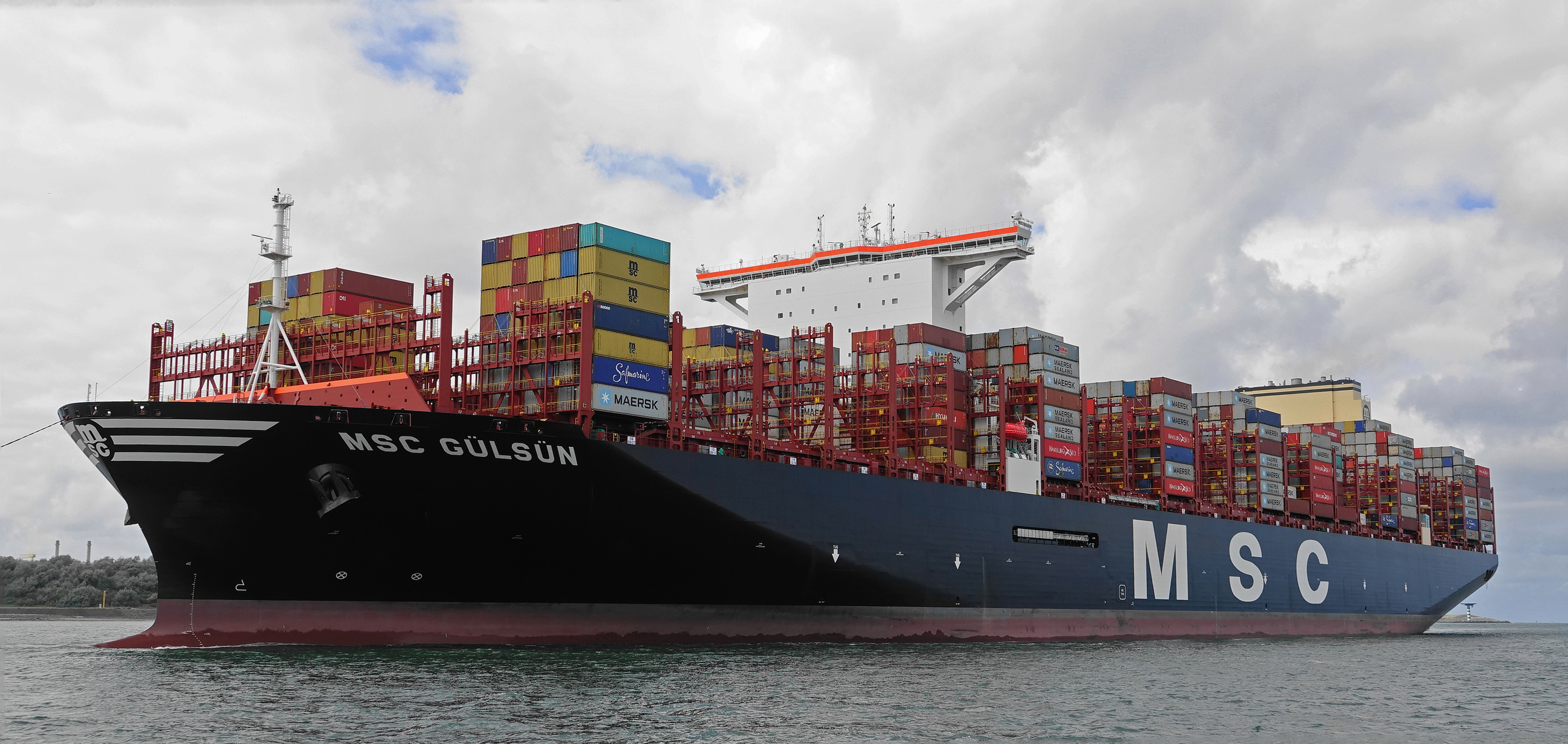
- MSC Gülsün entering the port of Rotterdam

Class overview
- Builders: Samsung Heavy Industries; Daewoo Shipbuilding & Marine Engineering
- Operators: Mediterranean Shipping Company
- In service: 2019–present
- Planned: 16
- Completed: 16
- Active: 16

General characteristics (SHI)
- Type: Container ship
- Tonnage: 232,618 GT
- Length: 399.9 m (1,312 ft 0 in)
- Beam: 61.5 m (201 ft 9 in)
- Draught: 16.5 m (54 ft 2 in)
- Depth: 33.2 m (108 ft 11 in)
- Propulsion: MAN Diesel & Turbo 11G95ME-C
- Capacity: 23,756 TEU

General characteristics (DSME)
- Type: Container ship
- Tonnage: 228,714 GT
- Length: 399.9 m (1,312 ft 0 in)
- Beam: 61 m (200 ft 2 in)
- Draught: 16.5 m (54 ft 2 in)
- Depth: 33.2 m (108 ft 11 in)
- Propulsion: MAN Diesel & Turbo 11G95ME-C
- Capacity: 23,656 TEU

The Gülsün class is a series of container ships built for Mediterranean Shipping Company (MSC). The largest ships have a maximum theoretical capacity of 23,756 twenty-foot equivalent units (TEU). They were the largest container ships in the world when they were launched in 2019, surpassing OOCL Hong Kong (21,413 TEU). They have since been surpassed by other ships like the Algeciras class (23,964 TEU). The ships were the first container ships to feature 24 containers wide on deck.

== Orders and history ==
In 2017, MSC confirmed the order of 11 container ships with a capacity of at least 22,000 TEU. Six of them were to be built by Samsung Heavy Industries and the remaining five would be built by Daewoo Shipbuilding and Marine Engineering. The first ship to be delivered was MSC Gülsün in July 2019.

In 2019 MSC reportedly ordered five additional container ships from DSME as part of the original order. These ships are expected to start delivery by the end of 2021.

On 28 July 2019 MSC Gülsün set a new container loading record by departing from the port of Tanjung Pelepas with 19,574 TEU of containers on board. Previous records were held by Monaco Maersk with 19,284 TEU and MOL Tribute with 19,190 TEU. The record has since been beaten by HMM Algeciras which carried 19,621 TEU from Yantian, China to Rotterdam.

== List of ships ==
Ship	Yard number	IMO number	Delivery	Status	ref
Samsung Heavy Industries (23756 TEU)
MSC Gülsün	2248	9839430	4 Jul 2019	In service	
MSC Samar	2249	9839442	31 Jul 2019	In service	
MSC Leni	2250	9839454	10 Sep 2019	In service	
MSC Mia	2251	9839466	6 Nov 2019	In service	
MSC Febe	2252	9839478	12 Dec 2019	In service	
MSC Ambra	2253	9839480	20 Jan 2020	In service	
Daewoo Shipbuilding and Marine Engineering (23656 TEU)
MSC Mina	4313	9839260	18 Jul 2019	In service	
MSC Isabella	4314	9839272	19 Aug 2019	In service	
MSC Arina	4315	9839284	11 Sep 2019	In service	
MSC Nela	4316	9839296	24 Oct 2019	In service	
MSC Sixin	4317	9839301	27 Nov 2019	In service	
MSC Apolline	4325	9896983	14 Apr 2021	In service	
MSC Amelia	4326	9896995	16 Jun 2021	In service	
MSC Diletta	4327	9897004	7 Jul 2021	In service	
MSC Michelle	4328	9897016	30 Aug 2021	In service	
MSC Allegra	4329	9897028	7 Oct 2021	In service	

== See also ==
- Pegasus-class container ship
- Olympic-class container ship
- London-class container ship
