= Normed =

Normed can refer to:

- Name of Ateliers et Chantiers de France, former shipyard in Dunkirk, France, between 1972 and 1987
- A mathematical object with a norm (mathematics)
  - Normed algebra
  - Normed vector space
  - Normed vector lattice
- Data normalization, in computer science

== See also ==
- Norm (disambiguation)
