= MSC Gülsün =

Container ship

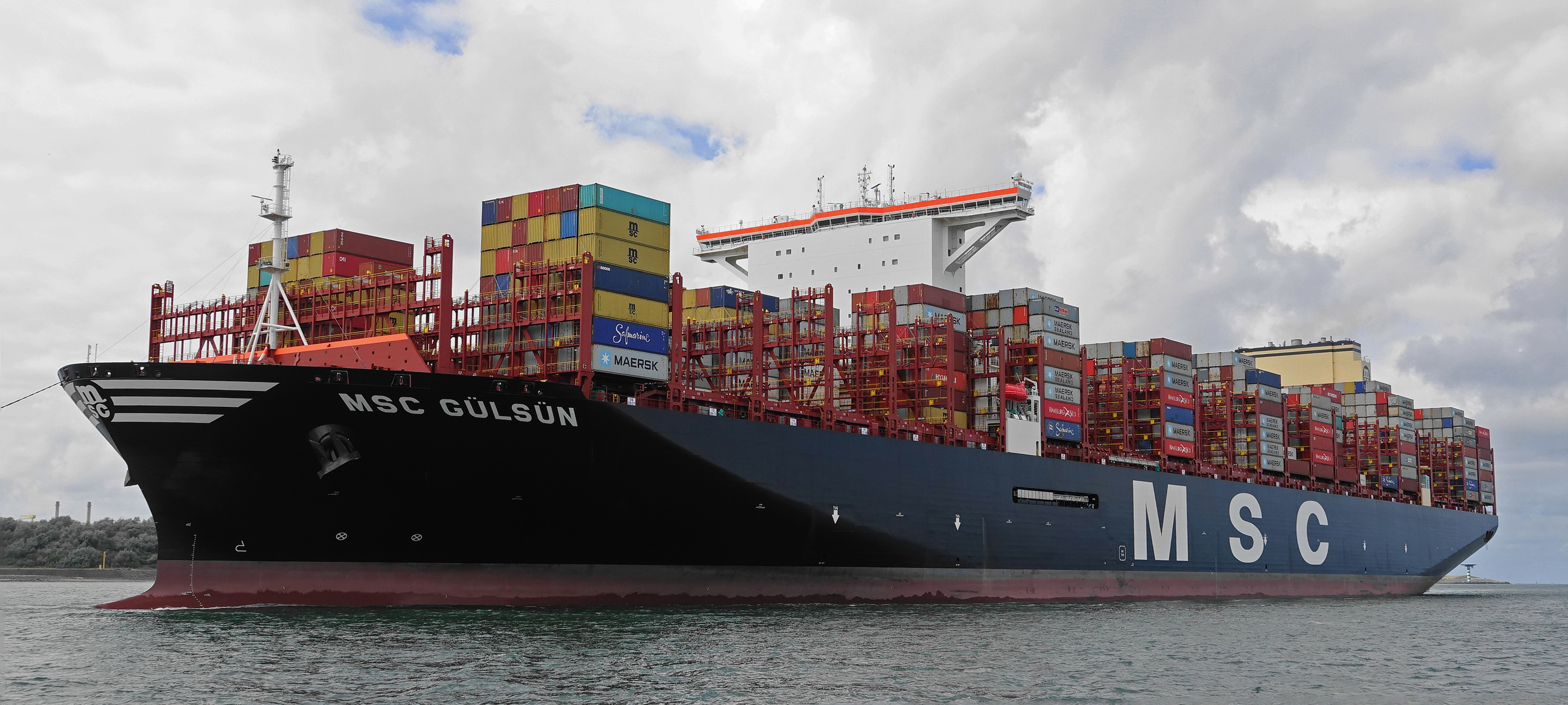
- MSC Gülsün at Rotterdam

History
- Name: MSC Gülsün
- Operator: Mediterranean Shipping Company
- Builder: Samsung Heavy Industries
- Yard number: 2248
- Laid down: 24 December 2015
- Launched: 9 March 2019
- Completed: 4 July 2019
- Identification: Call sign: 3FTV6; IMO number: 9839430; MMSI number: 372003000; DNV ID: 39594

General characteristics
- Class & type: Gülsün-class container ship
- Tonnage: 232,618 GT; 228,149 DWT
- Length: 399.9 m (1,312 ft 0 in)
- Beam: 61.5 m (201 ft 9 in)
- Draught: 16.5 m (54 ft 2 in)
- Depth: 33.2 m (108 ft 11 in)
- Propulsion: MAN Diesel & Turbo 11G95ME-C
- Capacity: 23,756 TEU

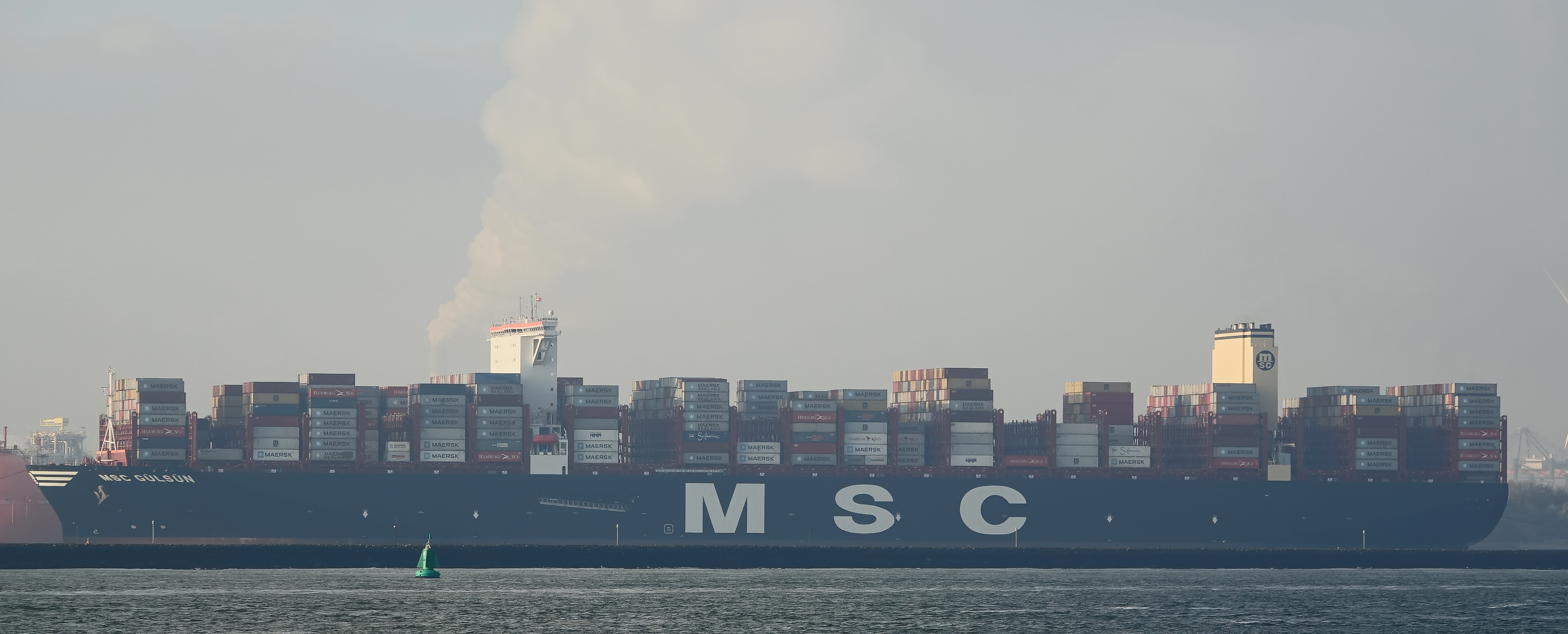
MSC Gülsün

MSC Gülsün, at the time of her launch in 2019, was the world's largest container ship. Built by Samsung Heavy Industries in South Korea, she is 61.5 metres (201 ft 9 in) wide and 399.9 metres (1,312 ft 0 in) long. With a cargo system designed by MacGregor International AB, the ship has a capacity of 23,756 containers (TEU) in rows of 24 across. MSC Gülsün is registered in Panama and operated by the Mediterranean Shipping Company based in Geneva, Switzerland and the Netherlands.
