= Pegasus-class container ship =

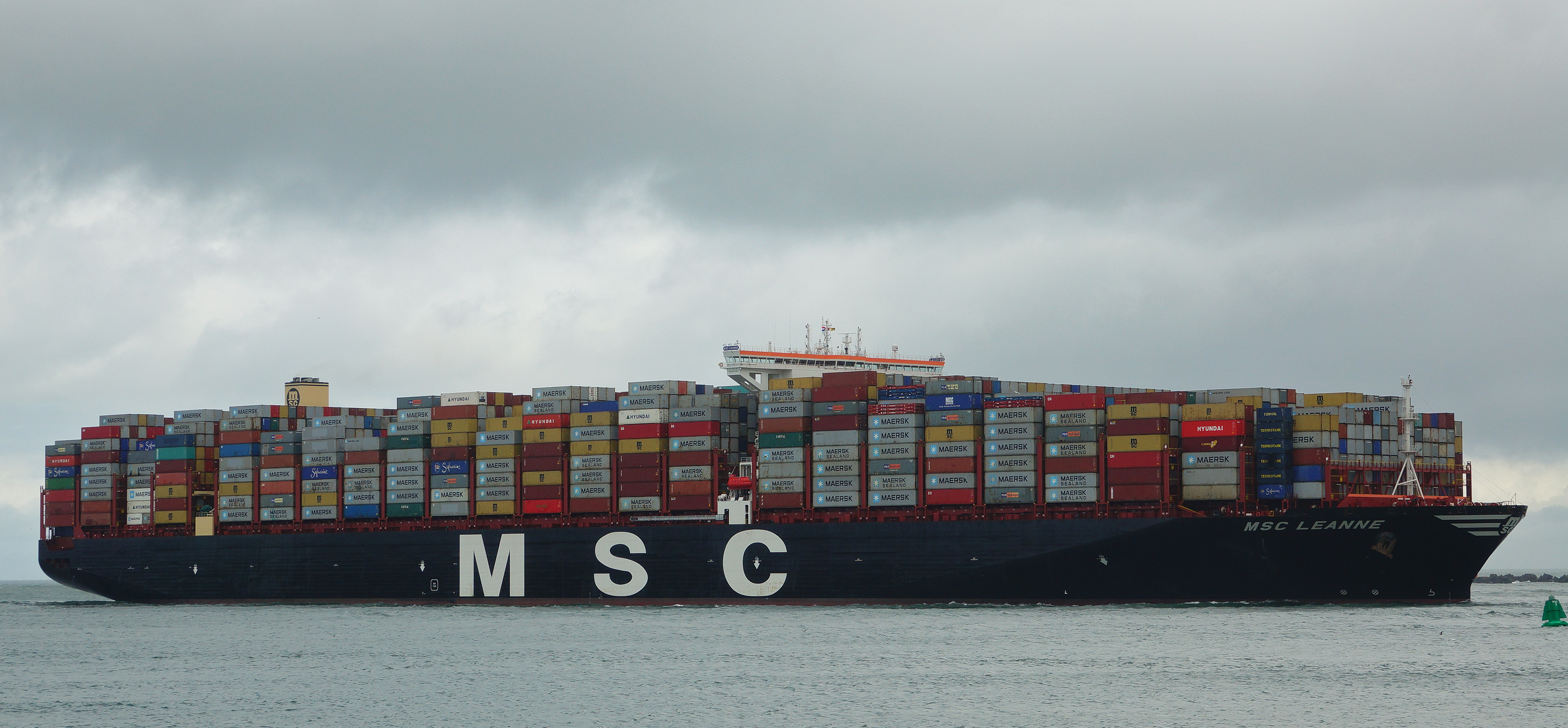
- MSC Leanne in the port of Rotterdam

Class overview
- Builders: Samsung Heavy Industries; Hyundai Heavy Industries; Daewoo Shipbuilding and Marine Engineering
- Operators: Mediterranean Shipping Company
- In service: 2016–present
- Completed: 14
- Active: 14

General characteristics (SHI)
- Type: Container ship
- Tonnage: 194,250 GT
- Length: 399.99 m (1,312 ft 4 in)
- Beam: 58.8 m (192 ft 11 in)
- Draught: 16 m (52 ft 6 in)
- Capacity: 19,462 TEU

General characteristics (HHI)
- Type: Container ship
- Tonnage: 187,587 GT
- Length: 399.98 m (1,312 ft 3 in)
- Beam: 58.6 m (192 ft 3 in)
- Draught: 16 m (52 ft 6 in)
- Capacity: 19,368 TEU

General characteristics (DSME)
- Type: Container ship
- Tonnage: 194,308 GT
- Length: 398.5 m (1,307 ft 5 in)
- Beam: 59.1 m (193 ft 11 in)
- Draught: 16 m (52 ft 6 in)
- Capacity: 19,437 TEU

The Pegasus class is a series of 14 container ships.

== Class ==
Six ships were built by Samsung Heavy Industries for the Singapore based Eastern Pacific Shipping. Another six ships were built by Daewoo Shipbuilding and Marine Engineering for Minsheng Financial Leasing and China Bank of Communications Financial Leasing. The last two ships are built by Hyundai Heavy Industries and are owned by Ship Finance International. The 14 ships were charted by Mediterranean Shipping Company. The ships have a maximum theoretical capacity of 19,368 twenty-foot equivalent units (TEU) to 19,462 TEU.

The class is made up of three series of ships, each built at a different shipyard. The ships are all similar in size but do have a somewhat different design. The ships are chartered to MSC by various companies.

== List of ships ==
Ship	Yard number	IMO number	Delivery	Status	ref
Samsung Heavy Industries (19462 TEU)
MSC Diana	2138	9755933	30 Jun 2016	In service	
MSC Ingy	2139	9755945	6 Jul 2016	In service	
MSC Eloane	2140	9755957	28 Sep 2016	In service	
MSC Mirjam	2156	9767376	16 Nov 2016	In service	
MSC Rifaya	2157	9767388	9 Feb 2017	In service	
MSC Leanne	2158	9767390	22 Mar 2017	In service	
Hyundai Heavy Industries (19368 TEU)
MSC Anna	2842	9777204	21 Dec 2016	In service	
MSC Viviana	2843	9777216	15 Mar 2017	In service	
Daewoo Shipbuilding and Marine Engineering (19224 TEU)
MSC Jade	4296	9762326	18 May 2016	In service	
MSC Ditte	4297	9754953	22 Jun 2016	In service	
MSC Reef	4298	9754965	27 Jul 2016	In service	
MSC Mirja	4299	9762338	7 Sep 2016	In service	
MSC Erica	4300	9755191	16 Nov 2016	In service	
MSC Tina	4301	9762340	15 Feb 2017	In service	

== See also ==
- Gülsün-class container ship
- Olympic-class container ship
- London-class container ship
