= Arklow Shipping =

Arklow Shipping Limited
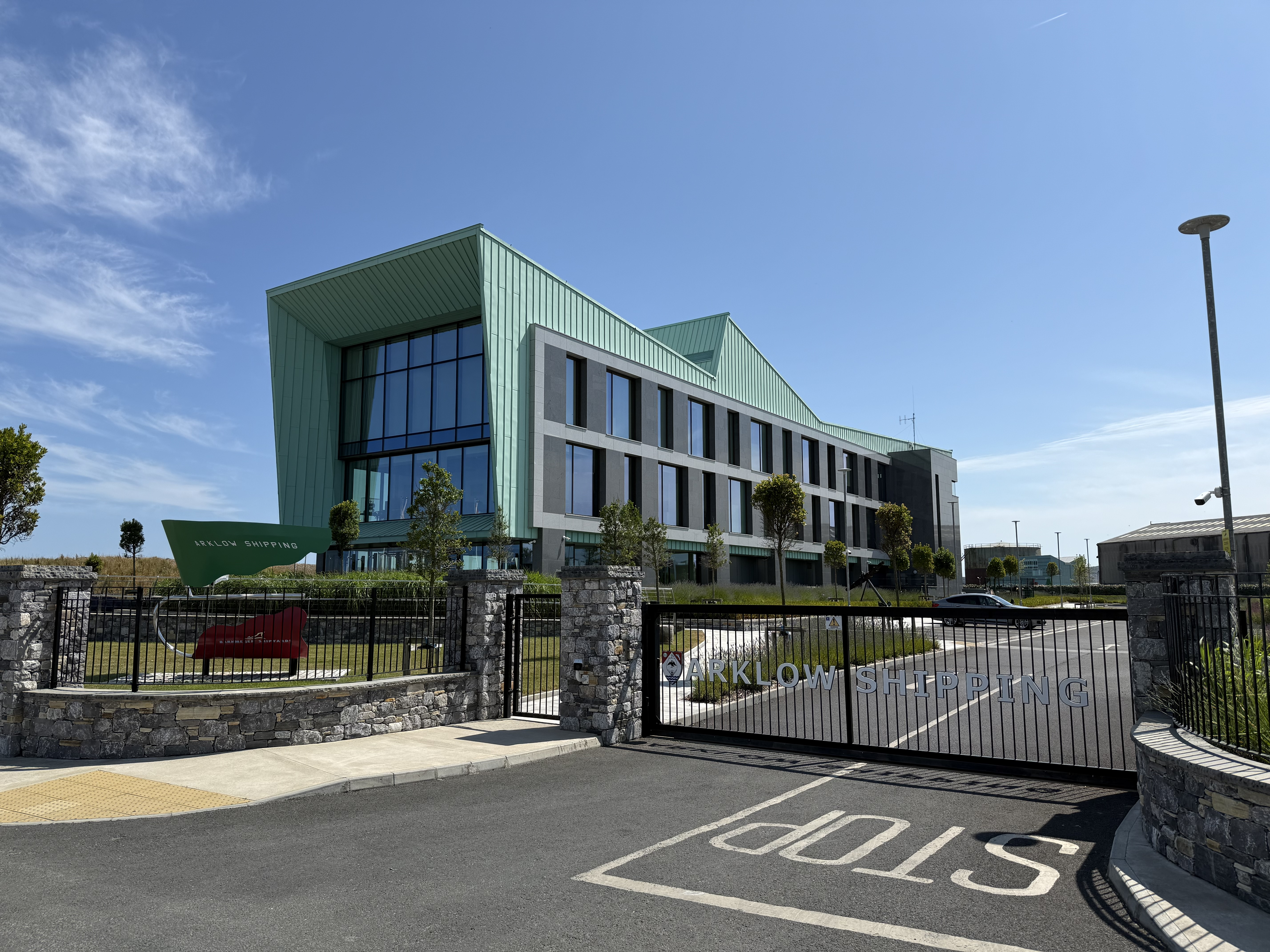
- Arklow Shipping Headquarters
- Founded: 1966
- Founders: James Tyrrell; Michael Tyrrell; Victor Hall
- Headquarters: North Quay, Arklow, County Wicklow, Ireland
- Services: Sea transport
- Divisions: Arklow Shipping Nederland B.V.
- Website: www.asl.ie

Arklow Shipping Limited is a coastal shipping line operating out of Arklow in Ireland and Rotterdam in the Netherlands. Founded in 1966 by Captains James Tyrrell, Michael Tyrrell and Victor Hall with seven ships, today it operates 59 vessels.

== Seaborne Freight controversy ==
Arklow Shipping was reported to be a backer of Seaborne Freight which was awarded a British government contract, later rescinded, to run roll-on roll-off ferries between Ramsgate, England and Ostend, Belgium in 2019. Arklow Shipping said that it had been in talks with Seabourne Freight twice in 2018 but denied that there had been an agreement with Seaborne or the Department for Transport. The company had considered investing in Seaborne and providing a couple of ferries, but nothing was signed. When the company discovered that Seaborne had no port agreement in Ramsgate it decided not to go any further.

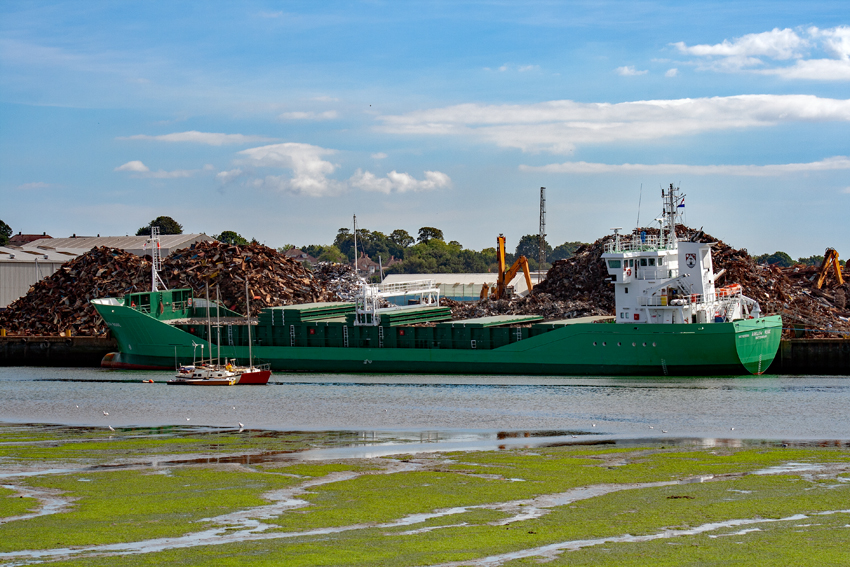
Arklow Rose loading scrap metal in Southampton
