= NYK Vesta =

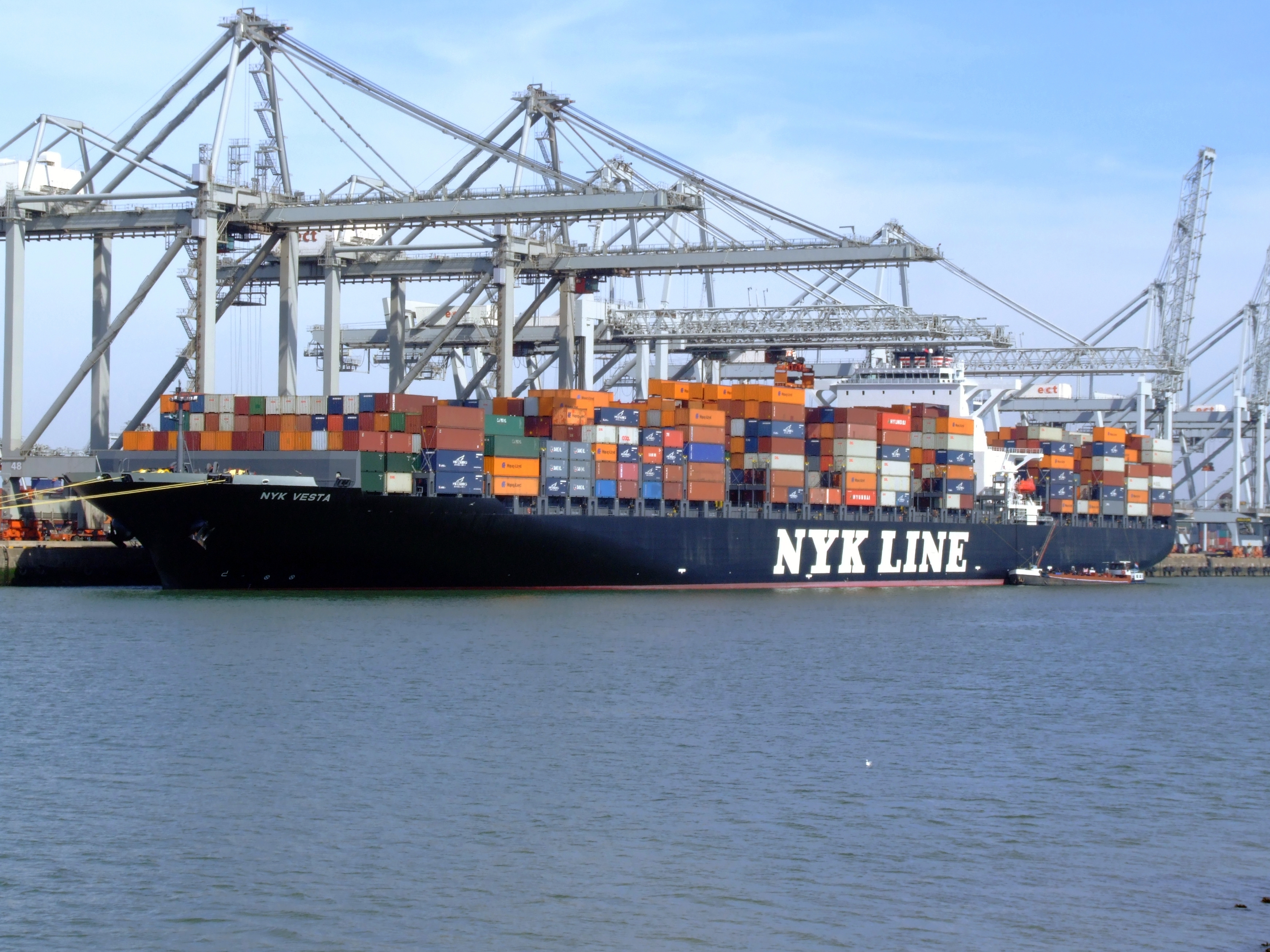

History
- Name: NYK Vesta
- Operator: Nippon Yusen Kaisha
- Port of registry: Panama, Panama
- Builder: Hyundai Heavy Industries
- Yard number: 1716
- Launched: 12 January 2007
- Completed: April 2007
- Identification: IMO number: 9312808; Call Sign: 3EJI4; MMSI number: 352804000

General characteristics
- Tonnage: 103260 gross tons
- Length: 338m
- Beam: 46m
- Draught: 15m
- Depth: 20m
- Installed power: 68,666kW(93,360hp)
- Propulsion: 1 oil engine
- Speed: 25kt

NYK Vesta is a large container ship operated by Nippon Yusen Kaisha and its port of registry is Panama, Panama. It is a sister ship to the NYK Venus.

== Hull and engine ==
NYK Vesta is a fully cellular container ship with a capacity of 8100 TEU. NYK Vesta was built by Hyundai Heavy Industries in Ulsan yard number 1716; was finished in April 2007. The dimensions of the hull are a length of 338m, beam of 46m, draught of 15m, and depth of 20m, while the tonnage is 103260.

NYK Vesta is powered by a MAN B&W 2 stroke 12 cylinder engine (design 12K98ME) capable of producing 68,666 kW(93,369 hp) driving a 1 FP propeller. This ship can reach speeds of 25kt.
