= NYK Venus =

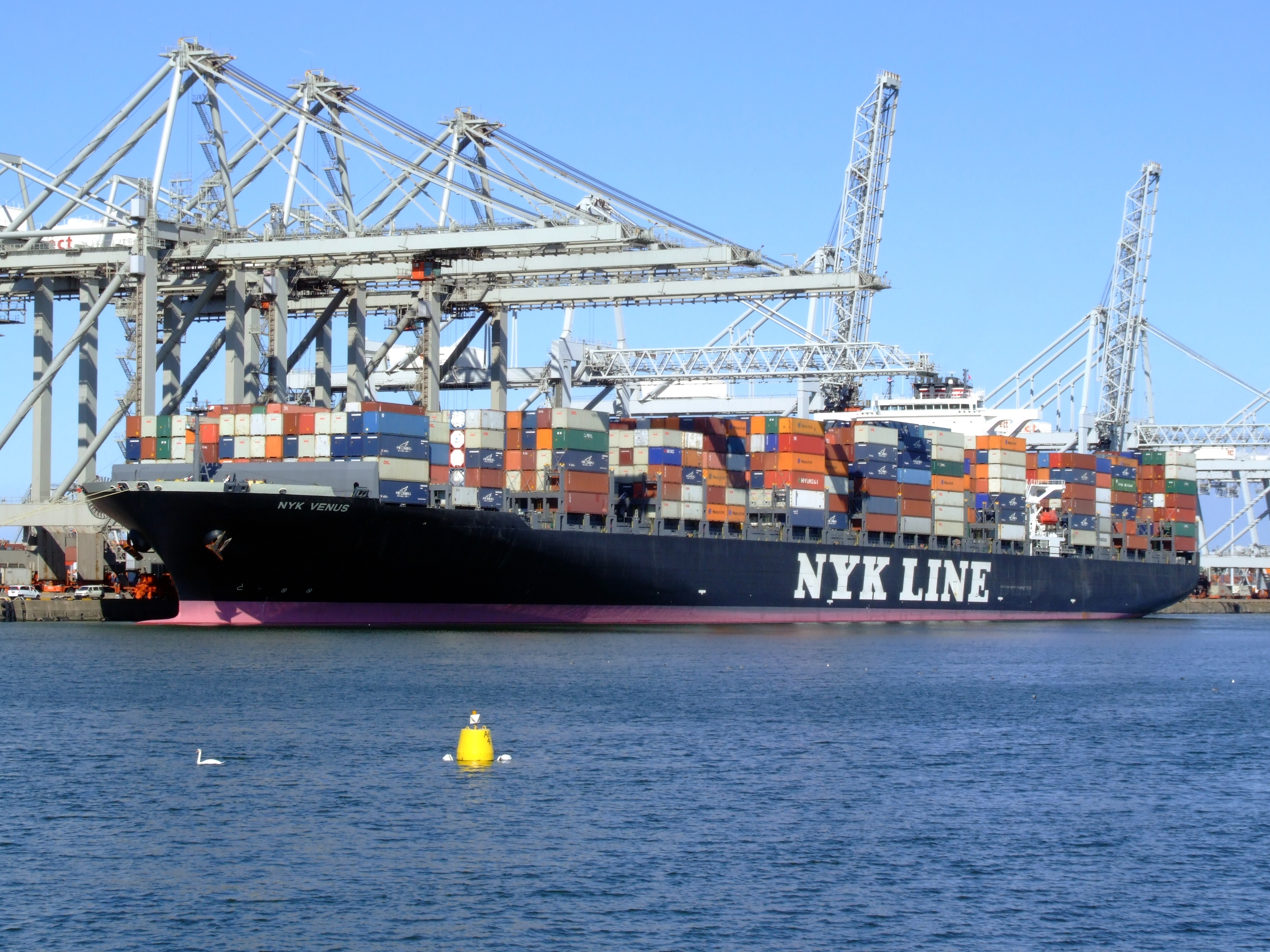
- NYK Venus at the Port of Rotterdam

History
- Name: NYK Venus
- Owner: NYK Line
- Operator: Venus Container Shipping SA
- Port of registry: Panama, Panama
- Builder: Hyundai Heavy Industries Co Ltd
- Yard number: 1715
- Launched: 29 December 2006
- Completed: February 2007
- Identification: IMO number: 9312793; MMSI number: 372512000; Callsign: 3EJG5
- Status: Ship in service

General characteristics
- Type: Container Ship
- Tonnage: 97,825 gt
- Length: 338.17 m (1,109.5 ft)
- Beam: 45.60 m (149.6 ft)
- Draught: 14.524 m (47.65 ft)
- Depth: 20.14 m (66.1 ft)
- Installed power: 64,033kW(87,059 hp)
- Propulsion: 1 MAN B&W 12K98MC oil engine driving one fixed pitch propeller
- Speed: 24.5 knots

NYK Venus was one of the largest container ships in the world when it was delivered to its operator, Venus Container Shipping. It is a sister ship to the NYK Vesta. The NYK Venus is owned by Nippon Yusen Kaisa (sometimes known as NYK Line) of Japan.

== Hull and Engine ==
The NYK Venus was built by Hyundai Heavy Industries. It is a fully cellular container ship at 338 m in length and 46 m beam, with a capacity of 9,012 TEU including 854 refrigerated compartments.

The vessel is powered by a MAN B&W 12K98MC engine, capable of producing 64,033 kW (87,059 hp) driving one fixed propeller. This two-stroke, 12-cylinder engine was built by Hyundai Heavy Industries. The vessel uses 5 auxiliary a/c generators.
