= Amplify Energy =

American oil company

- Amplify Energy Corp
- Type: Public
- Headquarters: Houston, Texas, United States
- Region served: United States
- Products: Crude oil
- Revenue: $311 million (2024)
- Staff: 229 (2026)
- Website: amplifyenergy.com

Amplify Energy Corp is a crude oil company based in Houston, Texas, USA. The company was founded in 2017, and is traded on the New York Stock Exchange.

== History ==
Amplify is the successor of Memorial Production Partners, which went into Chapter 11 bankruptcy in 2017 and was traded as Nasdaq: MEMP. Amplify's CEO beginning May 2018 was Ken Mariani, previously from EnerVest. Midstates Petroleum (previously NYSE: MPO) of Tulsa, Oklahoma, which had gone through bankruptcy in 2016, was merged with Amplify in 2019.

In the Memorial Production Partners 2017 bankruptcy, debt was reduced from $1.3 billion to $430 million. Memorial itself had, earlier, emerged from the NGP private equity fund and the Beta field in turn had been originally discovered in 1976 by Royal Dutch Shell. Huntington Beach field as a whole "was once considered the 12th largest in the nation, having produced more than a billion barrels since discovery by the Standard Oil Co. in 1920.

David J. Sambrooks, former CEO of Midstates, received $5.3 million in compensation in 2019, $1.1 million in 2018, $2.7 million in 2017. The 2019 compensation included $3.5 million in severance benefits. Likewise, Scott C. Weatherholt, EVP and general counsel, received $3 million compensation in 2019 (including $1.9 million in severance benefits), $1.6 million in 2018, and $416,000 in 2017.

Before the merger, the company bought back $1.3 million in stock in early 2019, having approved up to $25 million of buyback in 2018. After the mid-2019 merger, another $25 million buyback was approved, and the company purchased $24.9 in stock in late 2019.

Amplify's 2019 gross income was $275.6 million, versus $340 million in 2018. Two dividends were issued in 2019 totaling $15.9 million. The company had a revolving credit line with Bank of Montreal for $450 million; the company had an average of $265 million borrowed. The line of credit was reduced to $285 million in June 2020, and would be reduced monthly until it was at $260 million. In June the company had $264 million used in the line of credit.

Fir Tree Capital Management, a hedge fund founded by Jeff Tannenbaum, owns approximately 27.7% of Amplify's outstanding stock. Brigade Capital Management owns approximately 10.7%.

In 2019, its largest customers were Phillips 66 (27%), Sinclair Oil (21%), and BP America (13%).

CEO Mariani announced his retirement on April 1, 2020. CFO Martyn Willsher was announced as the interim CEO.

On April 20, 2020, the company was notified by NYSE that it was at risk of delisting for its low share price. Amplify had 6 months to cure this, but regained compliance by June 2020.

As part of the COVID-19 pandemic, the company announced on May 6, 2020, that it received $5.5 million in federally backed small business loans on April 24 as part of the Paycheck Protection Program. The Washington Post highlighted the loan, especially since Amplify is a public company and spent $26 million on stock buybacks; Reuters highlighted Amplify as an energy company that has not indicated it would return the funds before the amnesty deadline. Amplify expected most of that money would be forgiven per the PPP's terms.

== Wells ==
Its assets are in Texas and the West, with about 1000 oil wells and 1500 natural gas wells. The company uses fracking in "almost every well", including CO_{2}/water injection in their Bairoil, Wyoming wells, and large volumes of brine water in their wells in Oklahoma.

Reinjection of brine water into wells has led to seismic activity, so Amplify's permits to inject waste water have been limited. The company also fracked two wells in 2017 in Panola County, Texas.

=== Beta field platforms ===
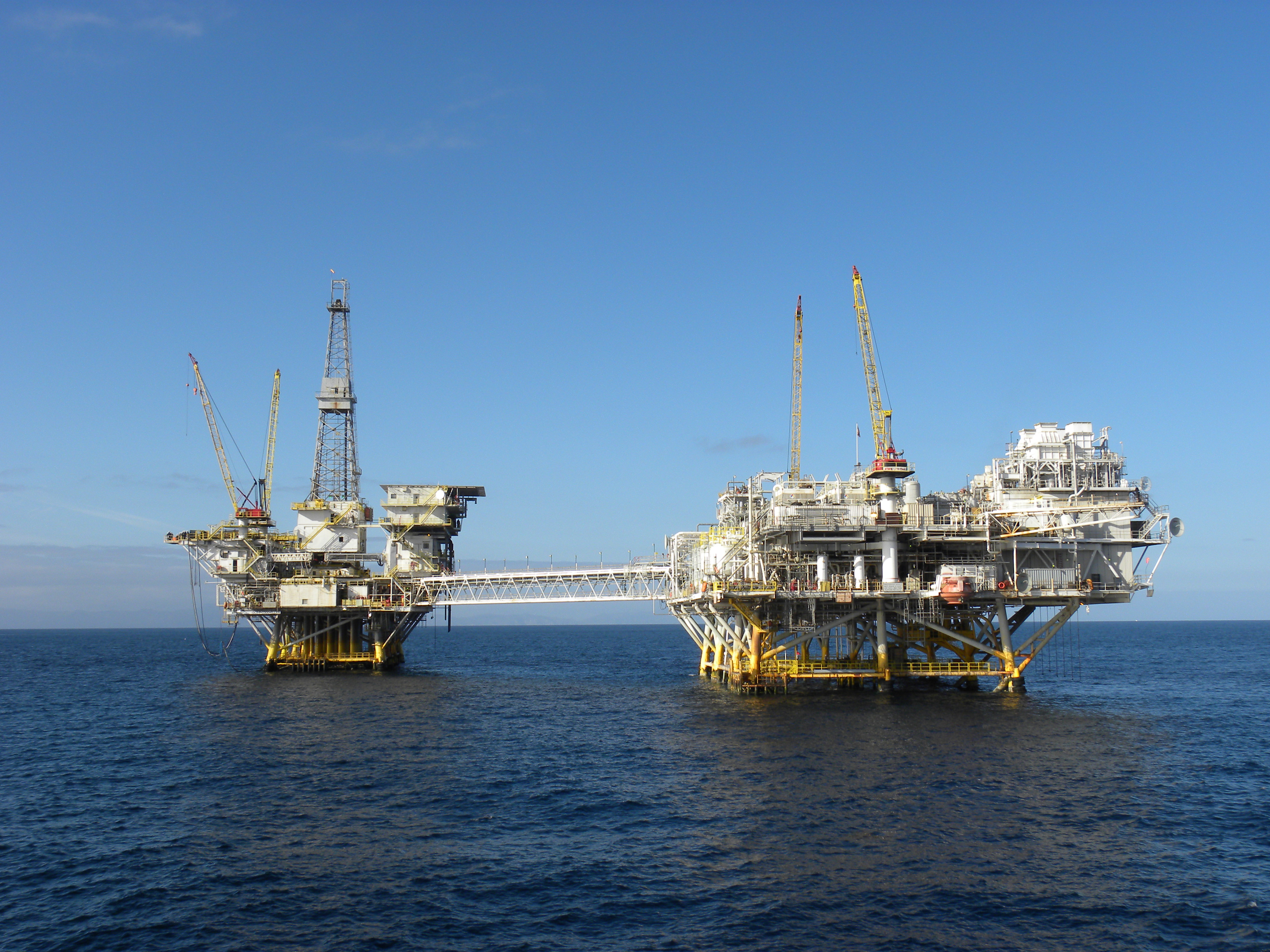
Ellen and Elly oil platforms

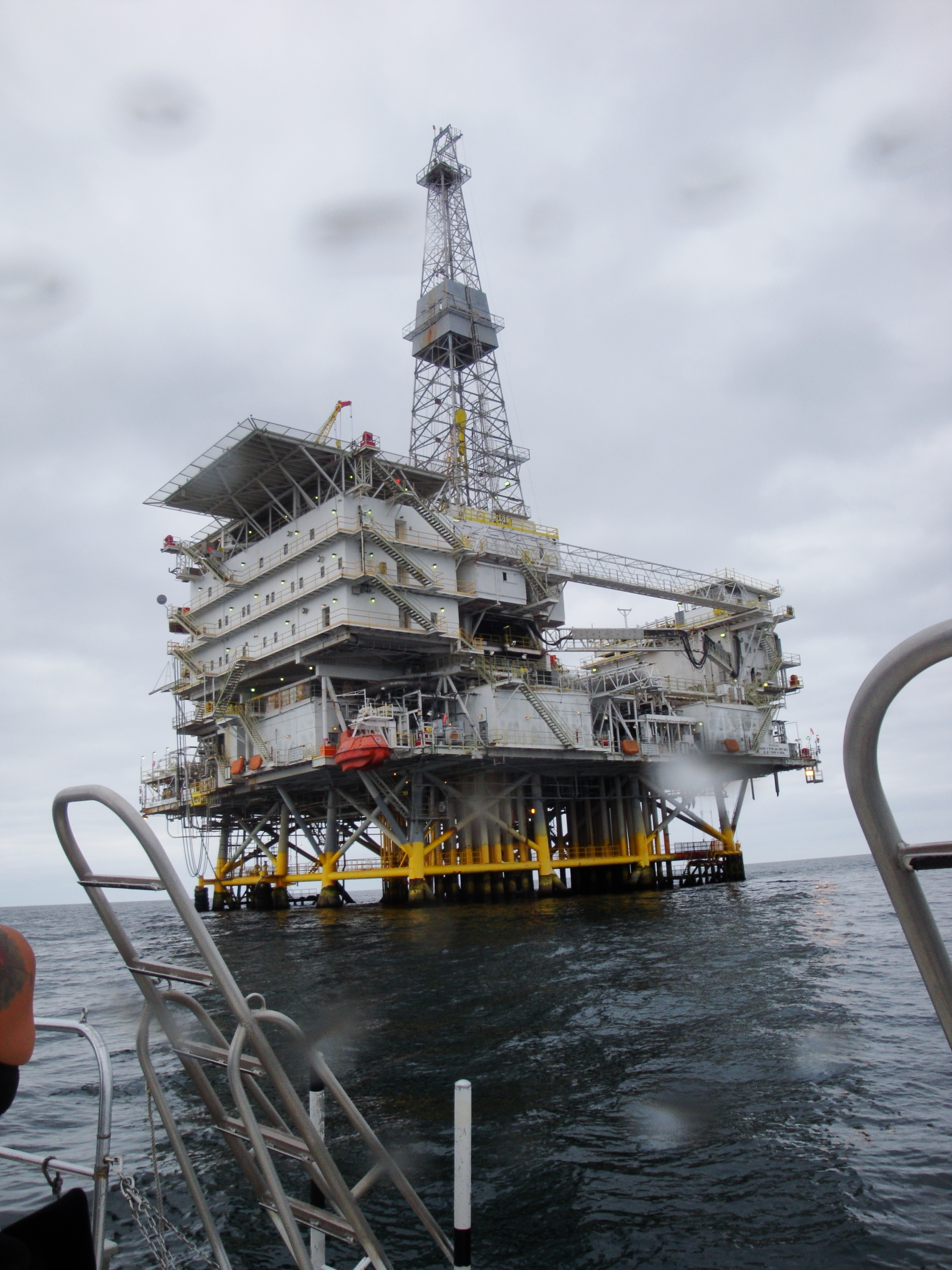
Eureka oil platform

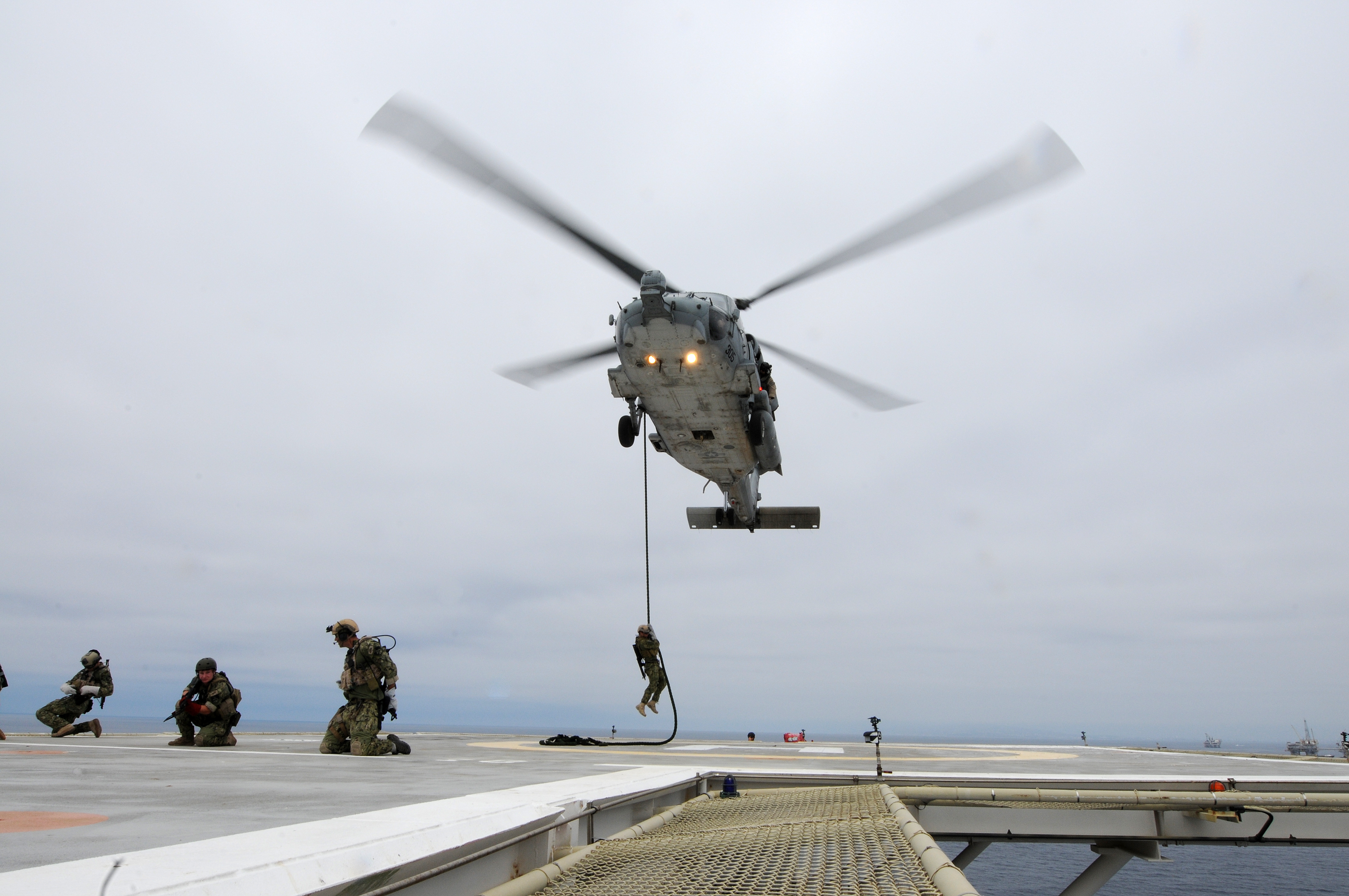
US Navy SEALs practicing on the Eureka oil platform

Amplify, through its Beta Offshore (Beta Operating Company LLC, registered in Delaware) subsidiary, owns three oil platforms near Los Angeles, California, titled Elly, Ellen, and Eureka. Elly and Ellen are connected. Ellen and Eureka have production oil wells and are connected by pipeline to Elly.

Elly separates the oil, gas, and water, burns the gas for fuel, and pumps the oil through a 16 inches (41 cm) pipeline, to the Port of Long Beach. San Pedro Bay Pipeline Company owns and operates the 17.5 miles (28.2 km) pipeline. Fracking is not used in the Beta field's unit, and would be banned or heavily restricted, per a court order given to Bureau of Ocean Energy Management.

San Pedro Bay Pipeline Company, registered in California, is owned by Amplify per Amplify's 2019 10-K. The Elly platform was installed in 1980, according to the U.S. Bureau of Safety and Environmental Enforcement.

=== Oil-in-ocean incidents ===
==== 2021 oil spill, pipeline drag ====
In October 2021, a major oil spill off the coast of Southern California caused dead birds, fish and oil to wash up on Huntington Beach and Newport Beach. The spill was initially estimated to be the equivalent of as much as 144,000 gallons of oil but estimates were revised down.

As of mid-November 2021, "officials [had] said the actual amount [was] likely much lower," likely around 25,000 gallons, although there was "no firm number." In 2024 linking to October 2021 reports, CNN used the figure 131,000 gallons for the spill.

In the initial aftermath of the discovery of the spill it was termed a "potential ecological disaster" by Huntington Beach mayor Kim Carr on October 2, 2021. Orange County supervisor Katrina Foley said the oil had "infiltrated the entirety of the (Talbert) Wetlands." "We are fully committed to being out here until this incident is fully concluded," Amplify CEO Martyn Willsher said. He also the company has owned the pipeline for about nine years.

The National Transportation Safety Board (NTSB) stated in a press release it was sending investigators to gather information and assess the source of the oil spill. News outlets asserted that Amplify and Willsher were being "evasive" about a 15-hour delay in notifying federal regulators about the oil spill, which was reported by its crisis company, Witt O'Brien's. Rebecca Craven, program director of Pipeline Safety Trust, said Amplify had "failed to publicly explain how it responded to signs of a possible failure in the pipeline."

In November 2021, Coast Guard investigators determined that at least one container ship, the Beijing owned by Capetanissa Maritime Corp. of Liberia / V-Ships Greece Ltd., “was involved in an anchor dragging incident on Jan. 25, 2021 during a heavy weather event that impacted the Ports of L.A. and Long Beach.” The owner and the operator have been named “parties in interest” in the investigation.

The Beijing is chartered by COSCO and is sometimes referred to as the COSCO Beijing. The MSC Danit was also identified as "moving over the pipeline while in high winds Jan. 25, before eventually moving out to the channel near Santa Catalina Island" and the Coast Guard has also designated Mediterranean Shipping Company, the operator of the Danit, and Dordellas Finance Corp. of Panama, its owner, as parties of interest in the ongoing investigation.

An anchor or anchors appear to have dragged the underwater pipeline 100 feet on the ocean floor and also appear to have damaged the concrete casing of the pipeline. The pipeline was "intact in October 2020 when the company [Amplify] that operates it last did an inspection, and the marine growth visible around the displaced section of the pipeline [as of October/November 2021] indicates the anchor drag probably was not recent" per Coast Guard captain Jason Neubauer. Neubauer is leading the spill investigation and was speaking to the press.

In August 2022, Amplify announced it would plead guilty to one count of misdemeanor negligent discharge of oil related to the leak. Amplify said it would pay a fine of about $7 million over three years and reimburse almost $6 million to government agencies, pending court approval of the agreement. As part of the proposed agreement, the company will also install a new leak detection system.

==== 2024 oil sheen in platform neighborhood ====
In March 2024 an oil sheen that officials said was about 2.5 miles long and half a mile wide was identified 1.5 miles off the coast at Huntington Beach. The U.S. Coast Guard's pollution responders, the California Department of Fish and Wildlife, Huntington Beach's lifeguards and the Orange County Sheriff's Office all engaged. "Early thoughts are that it’s from a platform," posted a county supervisor.

Amplify's stock dropped sharply amid the reports of the spill and, as of 5 pm local time Friday night, there had been no recovery in Amplify's stock price. The company said, on Friday, there was "no indication that this sheen is related to our operations" and that it would "cooperate ... and provide support in any way we can."

Per reports, 85 gallons of oil product representing 85% of the sheen were retrieved before weather deteriorated the same day and by the next day, Saturday, the sheen was reported gone. “Tar patties” found along the beach didn't "currently warrant closing the area [per the city, and] teams have started cleaning up." One grebe "with oil on it was recovered" per the Coast Guard which also "said the source of the oil sheen is under investigation". Neighboring cities of Newport Beach, Long Beach and Laguna Beach were monitoring their beaches.

Testing of the oil found that it was consistent with oil that seeps naturally from the sea floor rather than anything that would have leaked from one of the oil rigs or ships in the area. The Coast Guard said that the tests did not conclusively determine the origin of the sheen samples. "We have many samples from all the oil rigs and their products, as well. ... The oil doesn’t seem to be connected with the oil rigs,” said Petty Officer Richard Uranga, a spokesman for the Coast Guard. Three days later and in days after that, the company stock recovered most of its pre-sheen valuation.
