= Refugio oil spill =

2015 pipeline leak on the coast of California

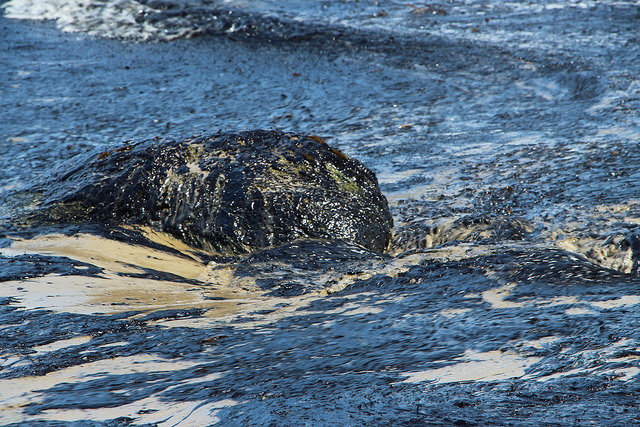
- Crude oil washes up on Refugio State Beach
- Interactive map of Refugio oil spill
- Location: Gaviota Coast, west of Santa Barbara, California
- Coordinates: 34°27′45″N 120°05′11″W
- Date: May 19, 2015

Cause
- Cause: Ruptured pipeline
- Operator: Plains All American Pipeline

Spill characteristics
- Volume: 105,000 U.S. gallons (2,500 barrels)
- Shoreline impacted: 7 miles (11 km) coated with crude oil; tar balls damaged beaches more than 100 miles (160 km) down the coast

The Refugio oil spill occurred on May 19, 2015 along the Gaviota Coast in Santa Barbara County, California, United States. It contaminated one of the most biologically diverse areas of the West Coast of the United States with 142,800 U.S. gallons (3,400 barrels; 541,000 liters) of crude oil. The corroded pipeline that caused the spill closed for almost 11 years, resulting in financial impacts to the county estimated as high as $74 million since it and a related pipeline remained out of service for three years. The cost of the cleanup was estimated by the company to be $96 million with overall expenses including expected legal claims and potential settlements to be around $257 million.

Hundreds of animals along the coast were coated with thick crude oil and many died. State parks and beaches located along the Gaviota Coast were temporarily closed. While much smaller than the oil rig blowout that resulted in the 1969 Santa Barbara oil spill, this incident may have greater long term effects due to its potential impact on four state marine protected areas. Due to the unique characteristics of the area, it is one of the most studied marine environments in the United States.

The oil spill, north of Refugio State Beach, originated in a 2 feet (61 cm) diameter underground pipeline designated Line 901 owned by Plains All American Pipeline. Crude oil produced by offshore platforms was transported from onshore receiving plants to another pipeline that transported the oil inland for processing. The 28-year-old pipeline was not equipped with an automatic shut-off valve and was eventually shut down by control operators in Midland, Texas when they were notified of the leak from parties who visually located the spill.

A subsidiary of ExxonMobil acquired the pipeline from Plains All American Pipeline in 2022 as three platforms owned by ExxonMobil used the pipeline to transport the oil after it arrived onshore. A new company, Sable Offshore Corp., was formed to own and operate the pipelines and the Santa Ynez Unit which includes the offshore oil platforms and an onshore processing facility.

== Background ==
The area was one of the earliest locations in California developed for offshore oil and gas production. Crude oil and natural gas produced by offshore platforms is processed at onshore receiving plants before being transported to distant refineries. The source of the spill was Line 901, a 10.6-mile pipeline (17.1 km) owned by Plains All American Pipeline. The 24-inch buried line (610 mm) was constructed in 1987 along the Gaviota coast to service the crude oil produced by offshore drilling. The pipeline can transport 48,000 barrels (2,000,000 U.S. gal; 7,600 m^{3}) a day and the contents are heated to as high as 120 °F (49 °C). Santa Barbara area pipelines are typically not heated but they are insulated to retain the oil's heat during transit. The viscous oil is also blended with natural gas liquids to allow it to flow more readily through the pipeline. Truck transportation of oil was phased out in Santa Barbara County in the 1970s because pipelines were considered a safer option.

=== Pipeline corrosion ===
Before the spill, an inspection of the 28-year-old Line 901 pipeline found extensive corrosion problems resulting in thinning pipeline walls. The pipeline did not have an automatic shut-off valve that would have been required on an intrastate pipeline as Line 901 is categorized as an interstate pipeline. Officials from Plains All American Pipeline claimed that installing a new valve would present other potential dangers. The line underwent a comprehensive internal inspection in July 2012 and since then the area where the pipe broke had been repaired at least three times. Line 903 is a much longer pipeline that transports the oil from Line 901 inland to gathering facilities and refineries. Line 903 was also found to be corroded though not as seriously.

=== Offshore oil production ===
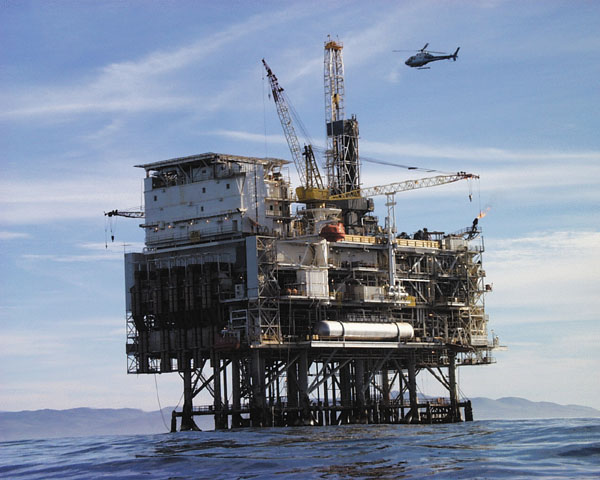
Oil platform off the coast of central California

Of the seven offshore platforms that used the line, ExxonMobil owned three: Hondo, Harmony and Heritage. After delivering their oil to onshore tanks at its Santa Ynez Unit in Las Flores Canyon, they depended on Line 901 to transport the oil from Las Flores to a pump station in a coastal canyon near Gaviota. The crude oil, known as Las Flores Canyon OCS (Outer Continental Shelf), then flowed into Line 903 as it was transported inland 128 miles (206 km) to gathering facilities in Kern County and on to refineries throughout Southern California. Venoco's Platform Holly located in the South Ellwood Offshore Oil Field also depended on Lines 901 and 903. The Holly platform is about two miles (3 km) offshore from the Coal Oil Point where about 4,000 U.S. gal (95 bbl; 15 m^{3}) a day comes from natural seeps. Line 903 was also used to move the production from platforms Hidalgo, Harvest and Hermosa of Point Arguello Unit owned by Freeport-McMoRan to the ConocoPhillips refinery in Santa Maria.

=== Gaviota Coast ===
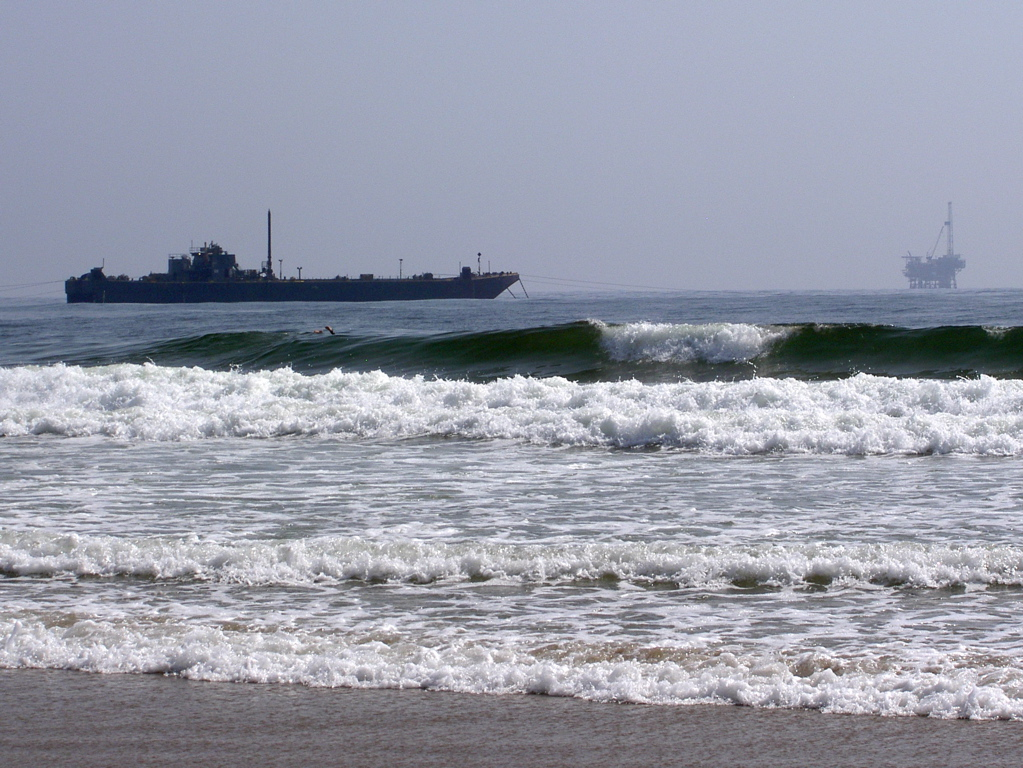
Oil barge and Platform Holly in 2007, seen from Ellwood Beach

The narrow coastal terrace where the spill took place is primarily used for recreation and cattle grazing. Local land use agencies have kept oil processing facilities to a minimum along the lightly populated coastline where much of the land is held in agricultural preserves under the Williamson Act and used for avocado and lemon tree orchards. The parks and agricultural areas on this narrow coastal terrace are situated between a rugged coastline and the Santa Ynez Mountains of the Los Padres National Forest. The nearest city is Goleta, about eleven miles (18 km) down the coast. US 101 and the main coastal railroad line both parallel the coastline and the Hondo and Harmony oil rigs can be easily seen offshore in the Santa Barbara Channel from the highway or railroad.

The Gaviota coast with its Mediterranean climate is considered unique for the biodiversity of ocean life. The unusual species found here are the result of the cold water from the north meeting the warm water from the south. The annual migration of about 19,000 Gray whales through the Santa Barbara Channel was in progress at the time of the spill. They may come as close as 100-foot (30 m) from the shoreline.

== Oil spill ==
=== Detection and response ===
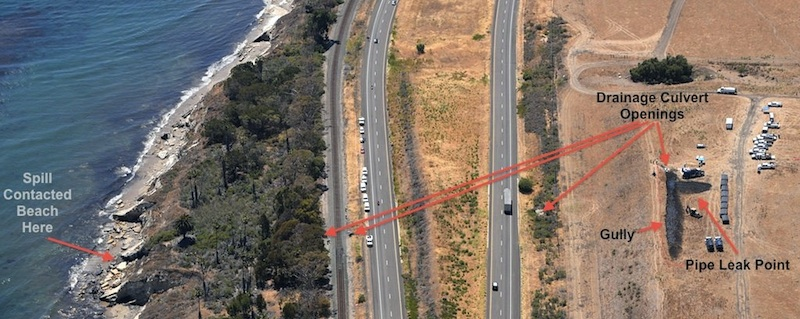
Refugio Oil Spill (2015)

On Tuesday May 19, 2015, the pipeline operators in Midland, Texas remotely detected pressure anomalies and shut down Line 901 at 11:30 am. The Santa Barbara County Fire Department initially responded around 11:40 am to a report of a strong smell coming from the area. Fire crews found the crude oil flowing from a drainage culvert that passed under U.S. 101, and into the Pacific Ocean and reported the leak to authorities. Local pipeline workers did not know about the leak until they were notified by the state parks staff around noon that there was oil in the water. After struggling to find the leaking pipeline, workers located Line 901 where it had leaked and flowed into the storm culvert around 1:30 pm. Clean-up efforts did not begin for 16 to 18 hours.

Company officials in Bakersfield who were responsible for notifying the National Response Center did not do so until 2:56 pm. The Center, staffed by United States Coast Guard officers and marine science technicians, is the sole federal point of contact for reporting all hazardous substances releases and oil spills. An oil spill triggers mandatory federal notification requirements in a timely manner but company officials said they were unable to contact employees on site as the employees were busy dealing with the immediate demands and distractions of the situation.

By the next day, the state parks agency closed Refugio State Beach and El Capitán State Beach. Governor Jerry Brown declared a state of emergency. Santa Barbara County also declared a state of emergency. The Santa Barbara emergency management team eventually recommended that the Board of Supervisors keep the proclamation of local emergency intact till until May 2016. They anticipated that a significant winter storm could bring up submerged oil and the situation could be reassessed in the spring.

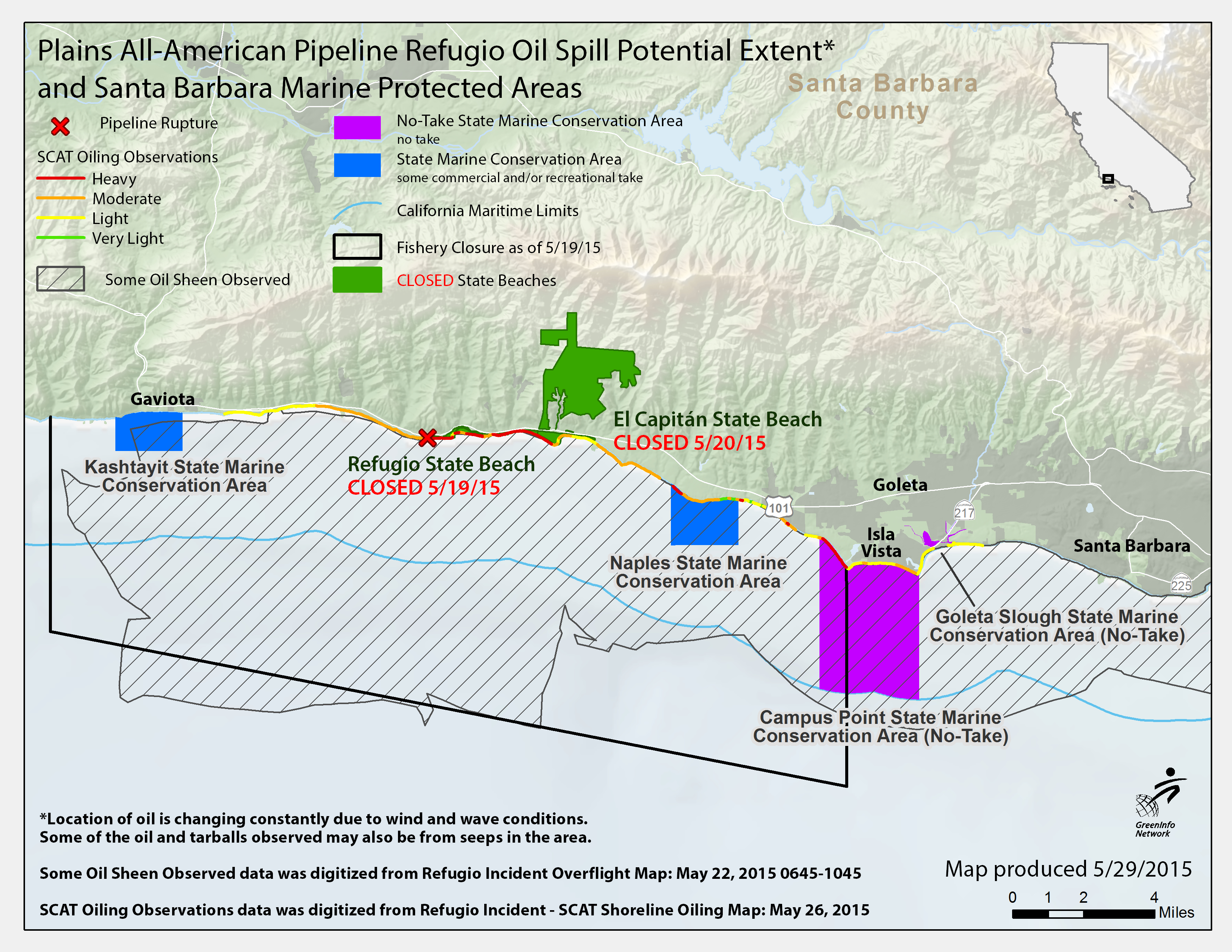
May 29 County spill map

=== Ecologically sensitive area ===
The oil quickly spread along 7 miles (11 km) of the coastline from Arroyo Hondo Creek to the west to El Capitán State Beach on the east. The slick reached four marine protected areas that have ecological or cultural significance: Naples, Kashtayit, Campus Point and Goleta Slough. Culturally significant land and artifacts to the Chumash people are also found in this area.

An immediate concern of environmentalists was the potential use of chemical dispersants. To keep big slicks from washing ashore, dispersants can be used to break the oil into small droplets that disperse throughout the water column. There are significant concerns about the health effects of the dispersants and the effects on aquatic life. Coast Guard officials overseeing the cleanup indicated that no chemical dispersants were being used but did not immediately rule the use of them out.

=== Size of spill and cleanup efforts ===
Plains All American Pipeline stated on May 20, 2015 that at the time of the spill the pipeline was operating at maximum capacity of 84,000 US gallons; 320 cubic metres (2,000 bbl) per hour. They reported on August 14, 2015, that a total of 142,800 U.S. gallons (3,400 barrels; 541 cubic meters) crude oil had leaked from the pipeline.

Preliminary reports estimated that 20,000 U.S. gallons (480 bbl; 76 m^{3}) to 21,000 U.S. gallons (500 bbl; 79 m^{3}) of oil was spilled into the ocean through a highway drainage culvert adjacent to the broken pipeline. The amount of oil leaked was later revised to over 105,000 U.S. gallons (2,500 barrels; 400 cubic meters). A Unified Command (ICS) was established consisting of local, state and federal agencies. This included the United States Coast Guard, the U.S. Environmental Protection Agency, California Department of Fish and Wildlife including the Office of Spill Prevention and Response, and the Santa Barbara Office of Emergency Management together with the responsible party, Plains All American Pipeline. The federal Pipeline and Hazardous Materials Safety Administration ordered the pipeline operator to provide them with the ruptured pipe for metallurgical testing in order to establish the condition of the pipe when it failed. All the oil in the pipeline had to be cleaned out before the section could be removed to determine if corrosion, pressure or a series of failures led to the rupture in the pipeline.

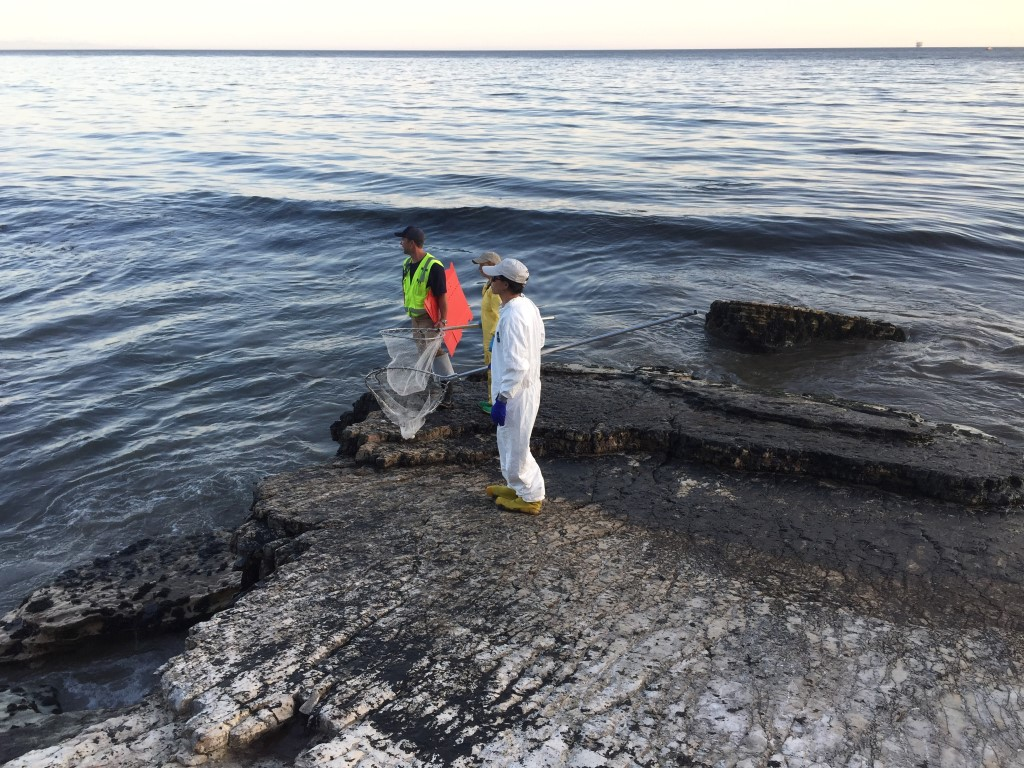
Wildlife operations crew responding to an oiled wildlife report west of Refugio State Beach on May 20, 2015

Scientists from multiple disciplines at the University of California, Santa Barbara and elsewhere began collaborating immediately after the spill. Based on lessons learned from studies of earlier spills, and using refined computer models, they predicted the spill spread and dispersion, including impacts on Los Angeles area beaches. They used this information to provide guidance to cleanup agencies and to monitor the effects on the ecosystem.

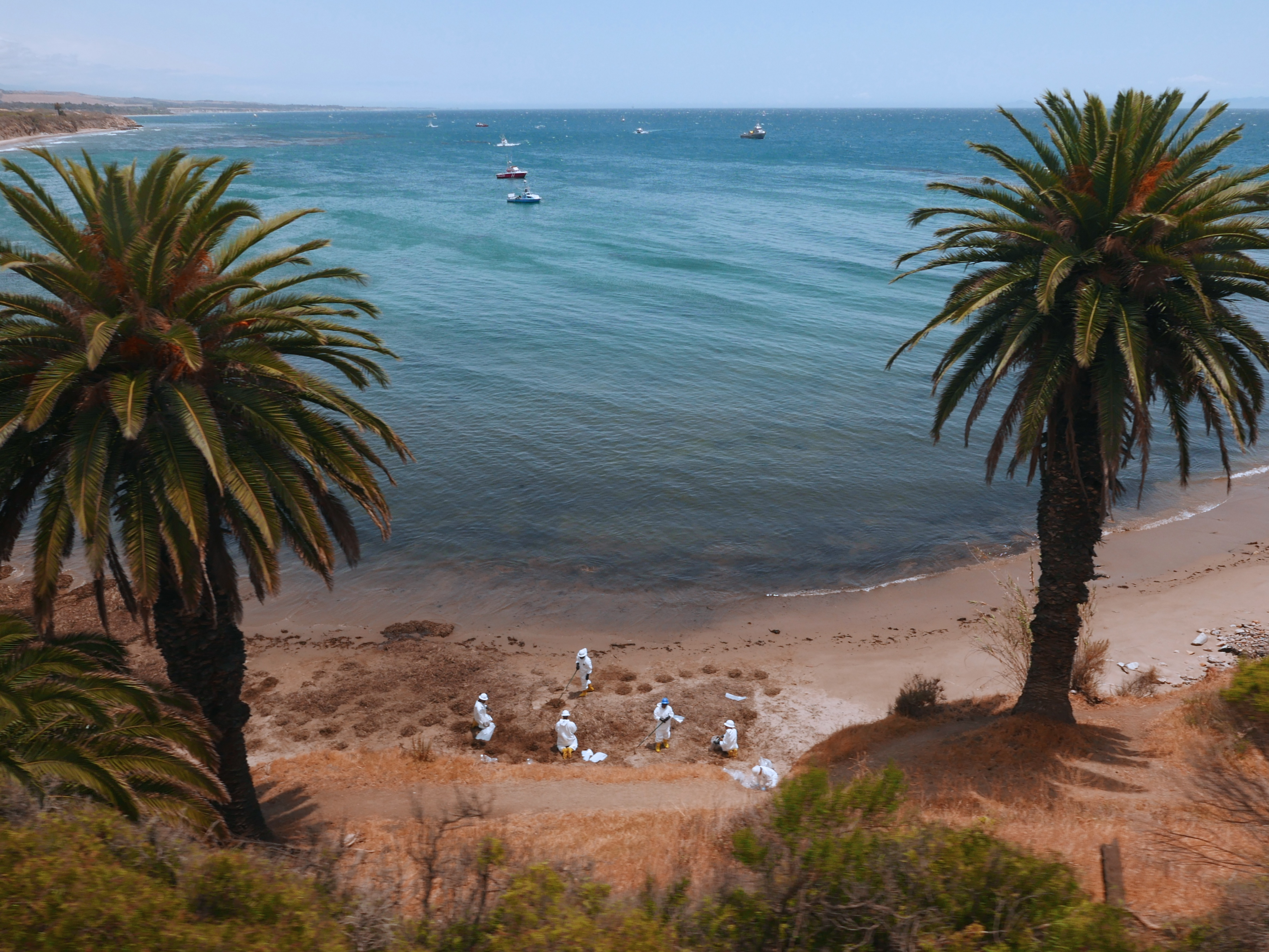
Workers cleaning Refugio State Beach on May 22, 2015

Some 3,000 feet (900 m) of floating containment boom had been deployed to contain the oil by the next day. Boats and helicopters identified patches of slick in the ocean so cleanup vessels could mop up the oil. More than a dozen vessels corralling and skimming the oil from the water were working in the days immediately following the spill. Three days after the spill more than 650 workers and 17 boats were cleaning the shoreline, gathering up an oily water mixture from the ocean, and hauling away more than 5,000 cubic yards (3,800 m^{3}) of oil-contaminated soil, sand and vegetation from the coastal bluff. A month after the spill, efforts continued to clean the 8-mile-long (13 km) portion of shoreline that was most heavily damaged. The sandstone cliff face along with large boulders that were splashed by the oil coming out of the culvert were difficult to clean. While sandy beaches farther south were inundated with tar balls, the beaches and rocky shoreline south of the spill had been drenched with a slick of fresh crude oil that had not been in the ocean long enough to be altered into tar balls by the wind and waves.

=== Tar balls ===
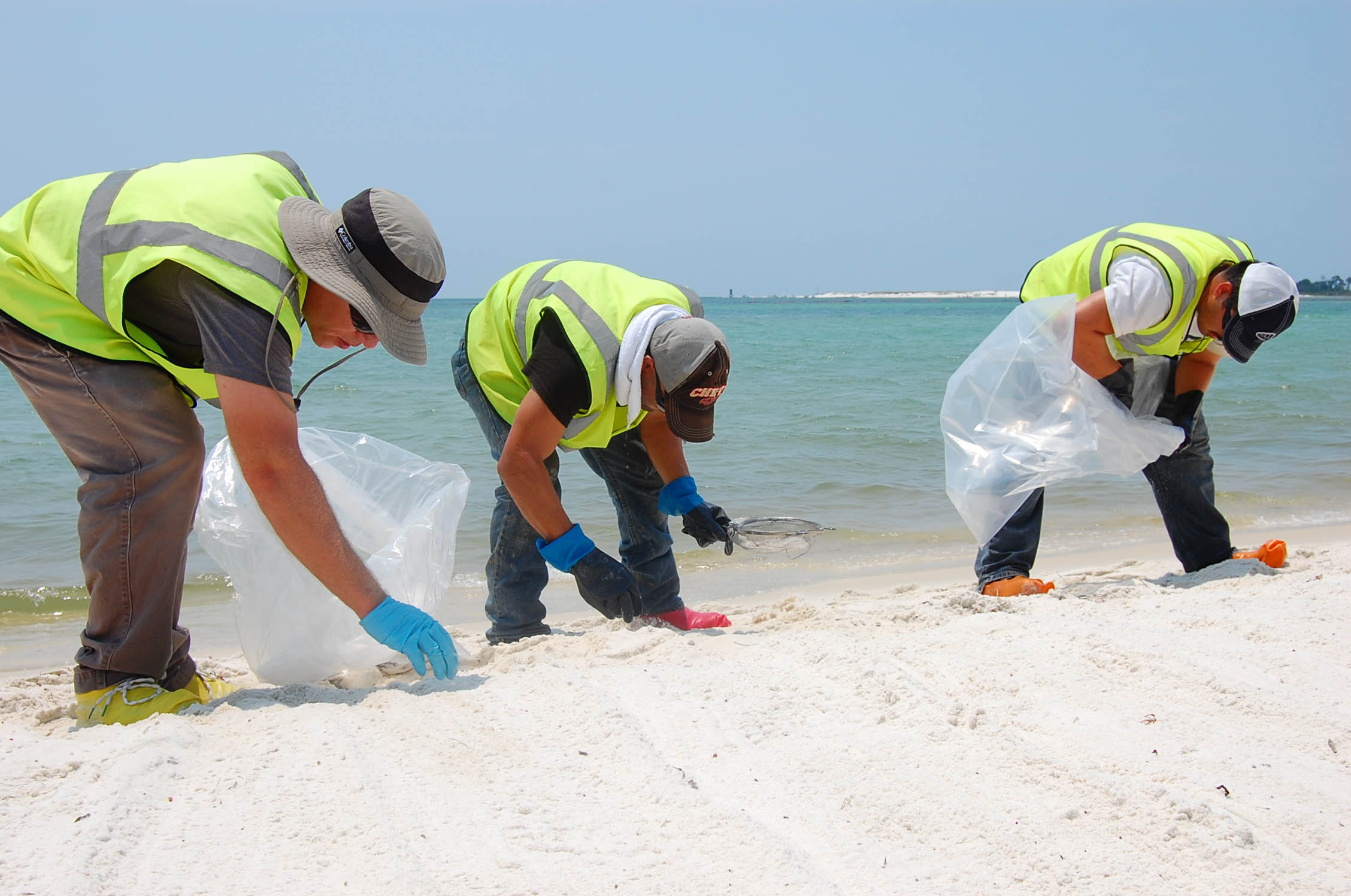
Removing tar balls from the sandy shoreline is laborious, detailed work as can be seen on this beach in Florida.

Days after the spill, tar balls began washing ashore on beaches down the coast in nearby Summerland and then farther down the coast in Ventura county. Although the source of these tar balls could not be immediately confirmed, the pipeline company sent workers to clean them up. Crews cleaned up coin-sized clumps of oil along the Rincon shoreline such as Faria, the beaches in the City of Ventura including San Buenaventura State Beach, and the extensive oceanfront of the Oxnard Plain.

Many officials and scientists said at first the tar balls appearance might be a coincidence unrelated to the spill. Coal Oil Point is very close and well known for the offshore seepage of oil at about 4,000 U.S. gallons (95 barrels) a day. Tar balls continued to show up on beaches farther down the coast in Los Angeles County including Malibu and the South Bay beaches on Santa Monica Bay. When tested, a tar ball recovered in the South Bay at Manhattan Beach matched the chemical signature of the spilled oil. Cleanup crews responded even farther south to beaches in Orange County.

By a month after the spill, 93% of the approximately 100 miles (160 km) of beaches damaged after the spill had been cleaned. The remaining 8 miles (13 km) was the area at the spill site near Refugio State Beach and the rest of the Refugio coastline south of the spill.

== Aftermath ==
=== Environmental effect ===
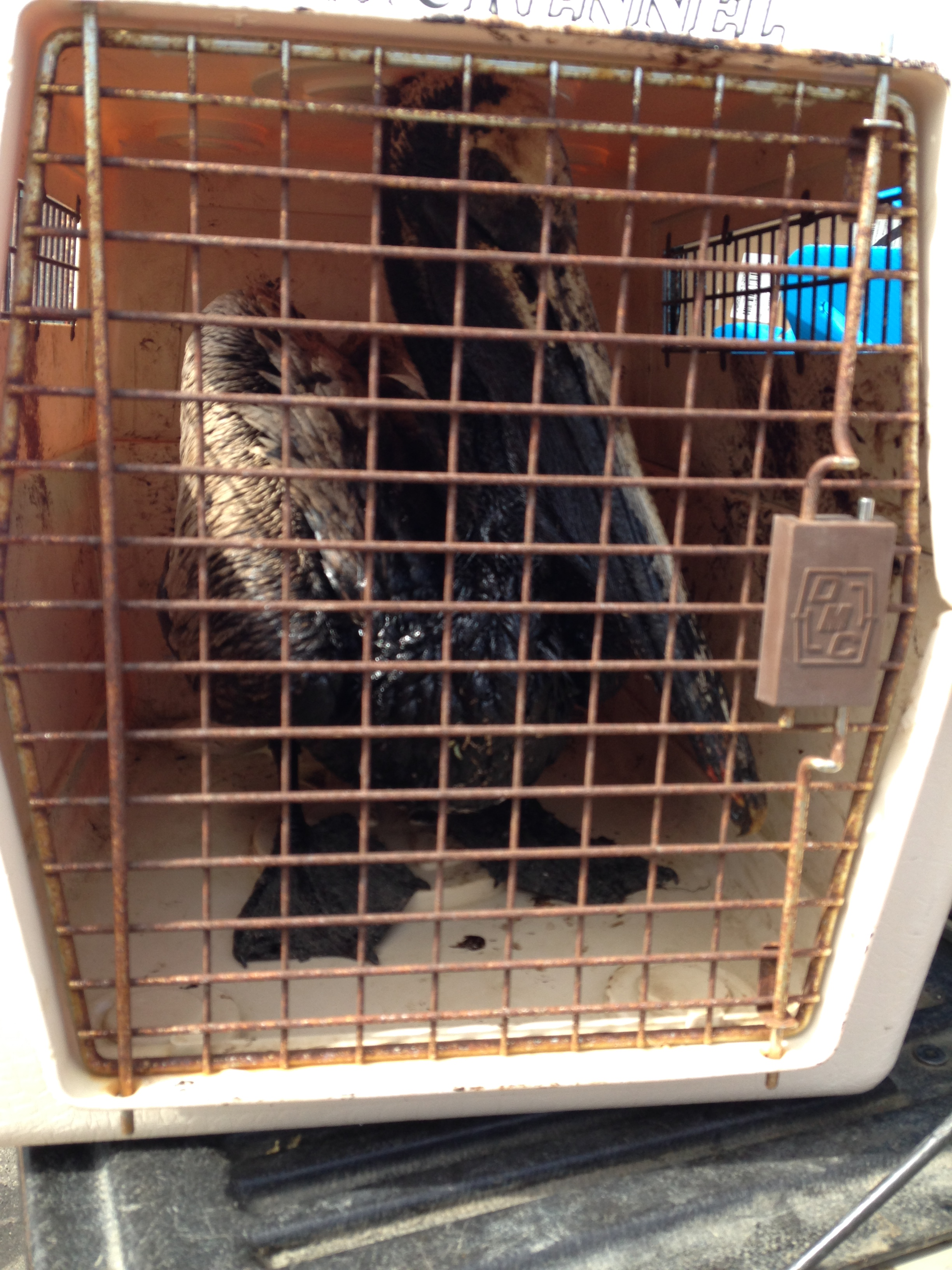
Oiled brown pelican found in Santa Barbara harbor by wildlife operations crews on May 21, 2015

The spill was much smaller than the nearby 1969 Santa Barbara oil spill on January 28, 1969 in which an oil rig blow-out spilled an estimated 3.4 to 4.2 million US gallons (81,000 to 100,000 bbl; 13,000 to 16,000 m^{3}) of crude oil over a ten-day period.

The thick crude oil damaged the coats, skin, beaks, and appendages of hundreds of animals. Workers eventually collected 202 dead birds and 99 dead mammals which included at least 46 sea lions and 12 dolphins. The full impact will never be known since animals may travel a distance before succumbing to their injuries. Sixty-five live birds and sixty-three live mammals were rescued.

Of the 69 animals freed after being cleaned and nursed back to health, 10 were adult brown pelicans that were released at Goleta Beach after spending three weeks in San Pedro with a team of scientists from the Oiled Wildlife Care Network that is administered by the UC Davis School of Veterinary Medicine. In September 2015, SeaWorld San Diego released the last three sea lions affected by the oil spill at Border Field State Park. Scientists will monitor the movements of some of the sea lions and at least five of the pelicans with satellite transmitters.

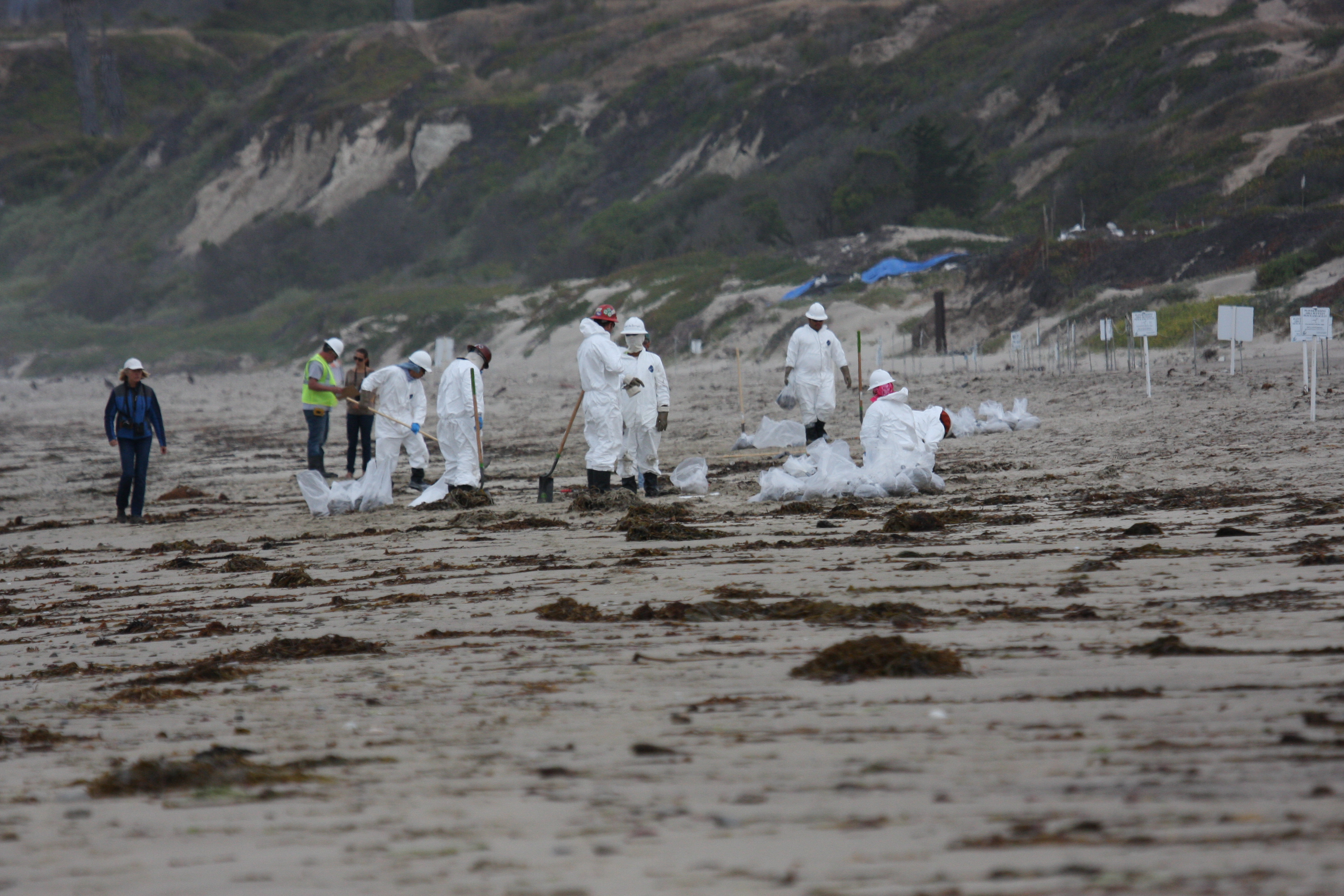
Wildlife operations crews work to protect snowy plover nests while clean-up crews remove oil from the beach on May 26, 2015

The spill cleanup occurred during the nesting season for snowy plovers, so special precautions were necessary while cleaning up tar balls. The birds are often found on the beaches along the coast of the Oxnard plain. Their nests are hard to see in the open sand and the birds are easily frightened away by human activity leaving the eggs to fast-moving predators such as sea gulls. Least terns were another endangered species of bird that was a concern during the cleanup efforts.

Marine researchers note that mammals and birds get the most attention but smaller creatures at the base of the ocean food chain are also harmed by the oil. Life on the sea floor and near the shore such as mussels, barnacles, and other shellfish are unable to move out of the way. When exposed to oil, these organisms suffer 90%-plus mortality and recovery of the population can take decades.

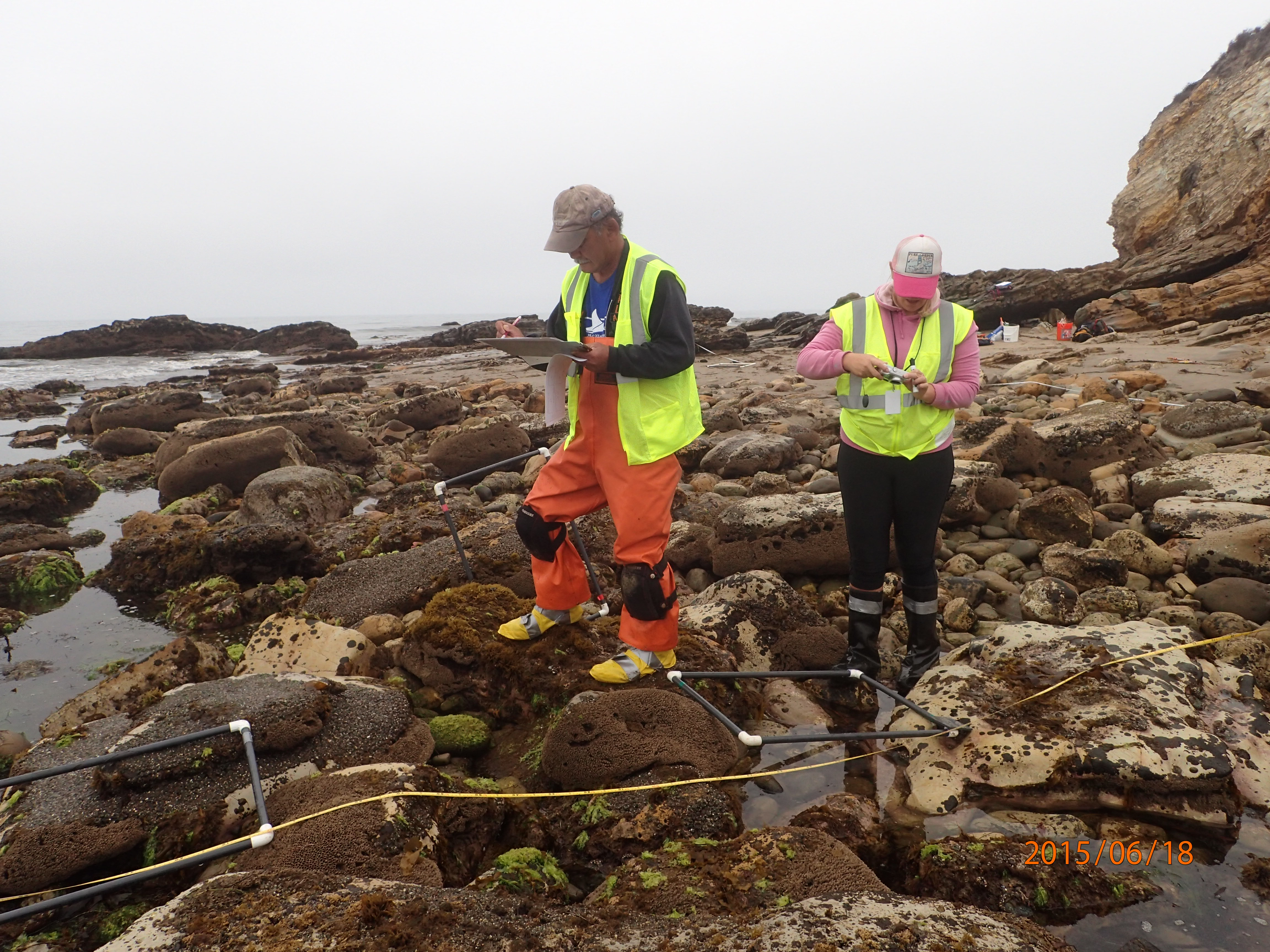
Scientists tracking changes in rocky intertidal habitats following the Refugio spill, June 18, 2015

Researchers from the University of California, Santa Barbara began collecting samples within hours of the spill to monitor the impact on the marine environment. Researchers and volunteers returned to the area many times to collect additional samples. Since students and researchers had previously used this area for study purposes, baseline data was available. David Valentine, a professor in the university's Department of Earth Science said, "The discharge of heavy oil at Refugio presents a unique opportunity to discover novel metabolic, genomic and ecological feedbacks among marine microbial communities, heavy oil and ecosystem response. We have the opportunity to study ecosystem changes and microbial reactions from the very early stages through an entire year. It's really rare for scientists to get day zero access to any sort of event like this."

=== Economic impact ===
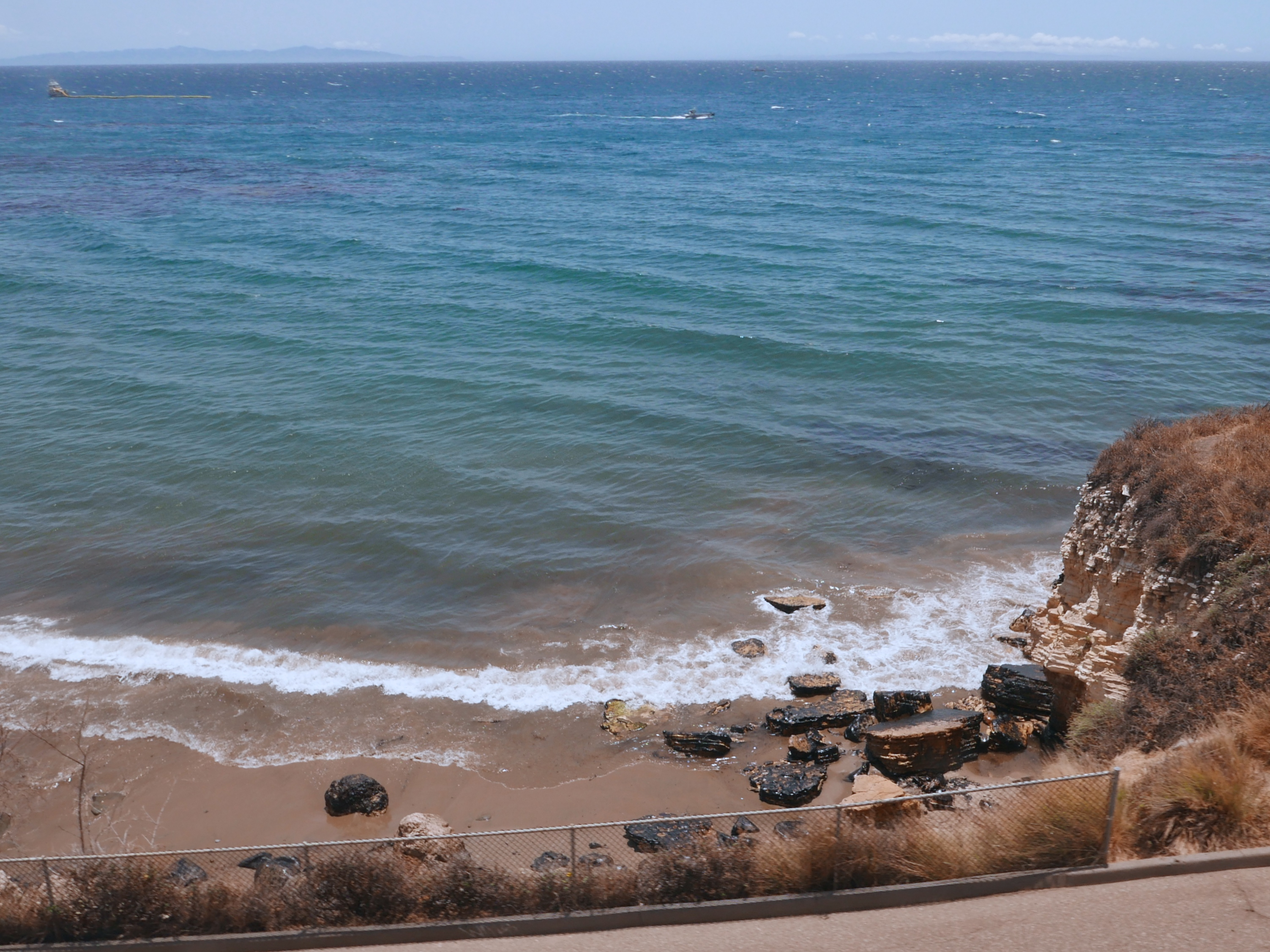
Oily rocks near Refugio State Beach on May 22, 2015

Plains All American Pipeline estimated that the cleanup had cost $96 million during a joint oversight hearing of the State Assembly Natural Resources Committee and Senate Select Committee on June 26, 2015. Overall expenses related to the spill were estimated to be $257 million in an earnings report for Plains All American Pipeline issued around the same time. This included the emergency response and cleanup efforts along with the expected legal claims and potential settlements. The CEO stated in the report that all but $65 million would be covered by insurance and that the figure did not include lost revenue from the pipelines that have been shut down. The Oil Pollution Act of 1990 requires whoever spills the oil to pay for the cleanup.

The economic consequences for the county were more difficult to quantify. The financial impact on the county was estimated by the California Economic Forecast Director at $74 million if Line 901 remains dormant for three years because of the dependence of the region's oil and gas industry to move product through this line. Workers' income, property taxes, and federal royalties are reduced while the line is out of service. The impact on tourism was not as bad as predicted and thousands of workers involved in the cleanup appear to have benefited some hotels.

In response to the spill, 138 square miles (360 km^{2}) of fisheries were closed. The order was lifted after six weeks when the Office of Environmental Health Hazard Assessment determined that the area's seafood was safe to eat and posed "no significant health threat." The closure impacted commercial fishermen and fishing charters. Local commercial fishermen reported that it was tough to sell the fish caught outside of the closed area because of the impression that all of the region's seafood was tainted from the oil spill. There is also a long term concern that the oil may have wiped out the main food source for some sea life in the area. The predominant products from the Santa Barbara region are red sea urchin and red rock crab with an average of $11 million in sales revenue per year

=== Recreation impacts ===
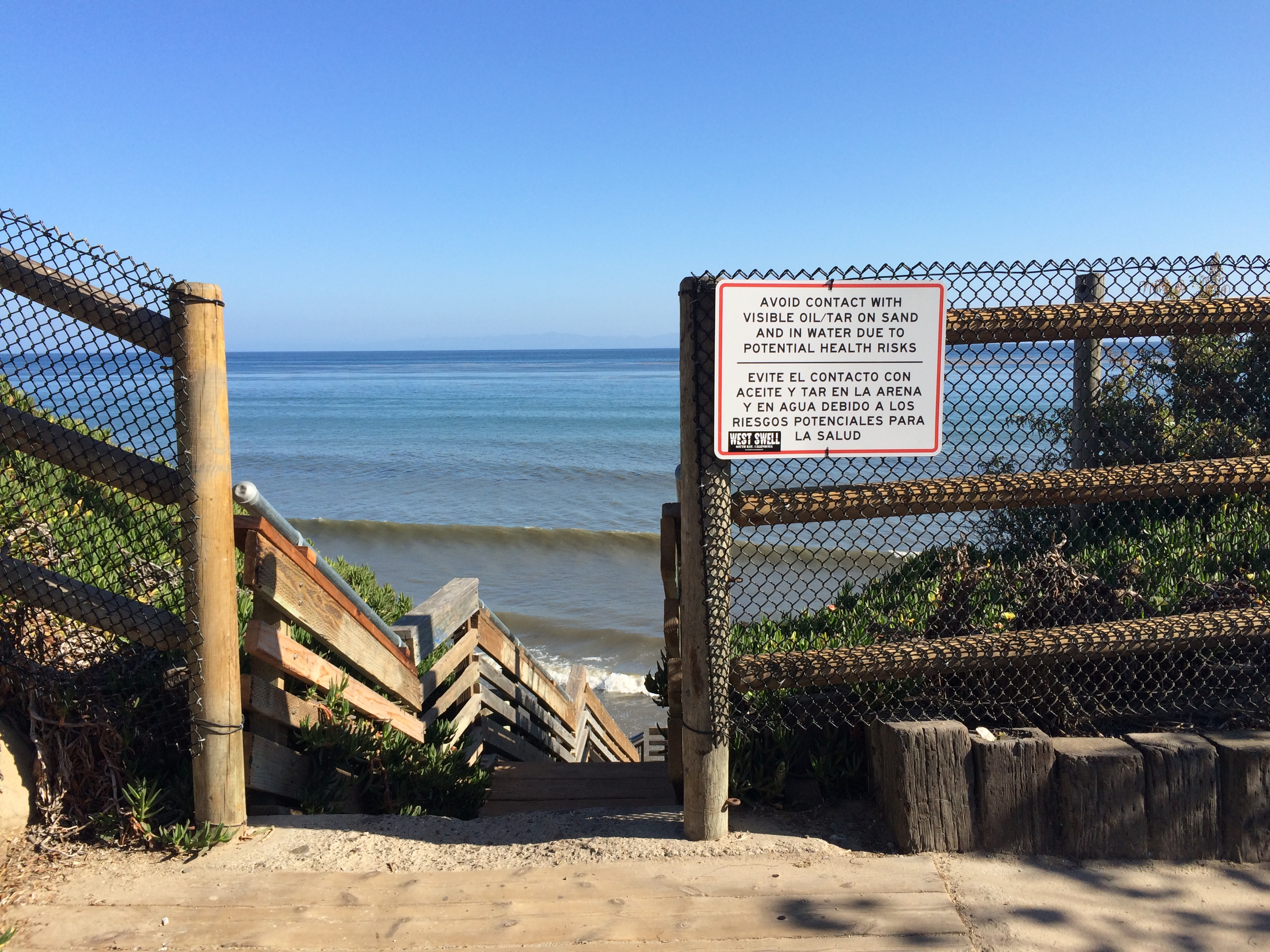
"Avoid contact with visible oil/tar on sand and in water due to potential health risks", at a beach access point in Isla Vista in July 2015

Although lightly populated, recreation brings outdoor enthusiasts to the Gaviota Coast. The spill affected visitors to both public and private facilities in the area. The state closed heavily used El Capitán State Beach for a month, which was finally reopened on June 26 for camping and day use. Refugio State Beach was more heavily damaged and did not reopen until July 17, 2015. These two popular parks quickly filled up with summer crowds when they reopened. Eric Hjelstrom, California State Parks sector superintendent said, "We were booked full the day we opened. Half of the people didn't know we had been closed, which is a good testament to how clean the park was."

=== Litigation ===
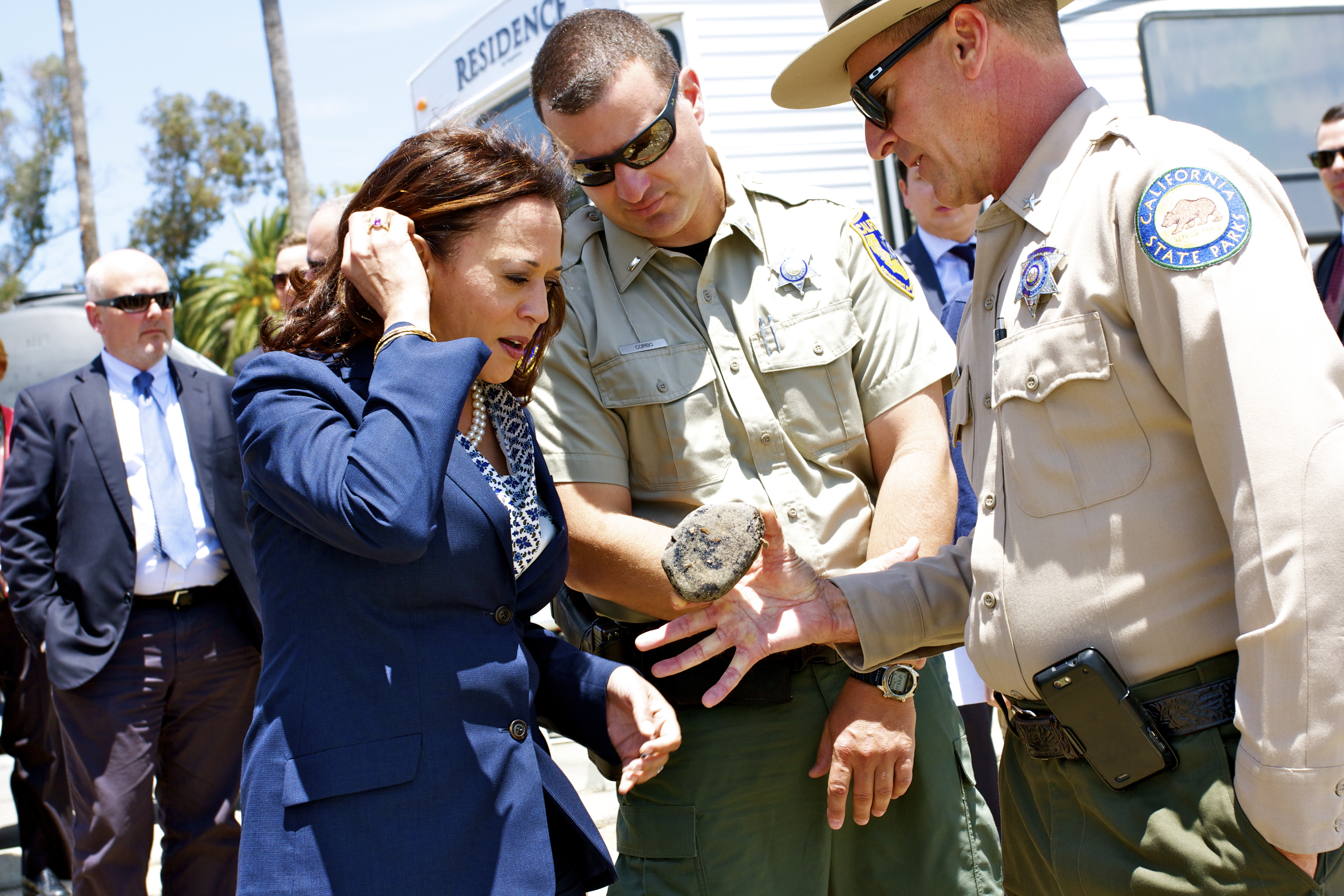
Attorney General Kamala Harris toured the clean-up efforts at Refugio State Beach and surrounding areas, June 4, 2015

Almost a year after the spill, the Santa Barbara County Grand Jury handed down 46 criminal indictments against Plains. The Santa Barbara County District Attorney also announced a misdemeanor count against one of the company's employees. California state Attorney General Kamala Harris, who had also opened a criminal investigation right after spill, said this prosecution will send a message to Plains and to the oil and gas industry in California.

The profound economic impacts on local fishermen, who couldn't fish during the fishery closures, led to the filing of several lawsuits. These suits, along with those by homeowners who are alleging losses in property value, were consolidated into a class-action lawsuit against Plains. An additional class-action suit was filed by stockholders claiming Plains provided "false and misleading statements" regarding pipeline maintenance and monitoring.

Plains All American Pipeline was ordered in March 2016 to stop misleading claimants who sought interim damages. A U.S. District Court issued an order that stated that Plains was misleading "victims towards unwittingly waiving their rights to full recovery" through the class-action lawsuit where they could obtain further compensation.

The city of Santa Barbara filed a lawsuit in May 2016 seeking $2.1 million in compensation from Plains. The media coverage of the spill had created the perception that the oil spill was in the city of Santa Barbara rather than 20 miles (32 km) away in Santa Barbara County according to the city officials. This discouraged visitors during the peak tourism season, losing the city millions of dollars in tax revenue.

The federal Pipeline and Hazardous Materials Safety Administration was requested to provide all records regarding the internal inspection of Line 901 conducted in 2012 and details of all other inspections since 2013 such as maintenance data, monitoring information, incident reports and repair logs. The Environmental Defense Center of Santa Barbara (EDC), who had requested the release of the records along with the Santa Barbara Channelkeepers, filed a lawsuit against the agency in December 2015 since it had been over six months and they had not received any of the requested documents.

After a jury found that their negligent practices contributed to the spill, Plains agreed in March 2020 to pay $60 million for penalties and damages. While admitting no guilt for their role leading up to the spill, the settlement by the Plains All American Pipeline Company included a consent decree with a multitude of federal regulatory and environmental agencies which includes various conditions.

=== Oil and gas industry ===
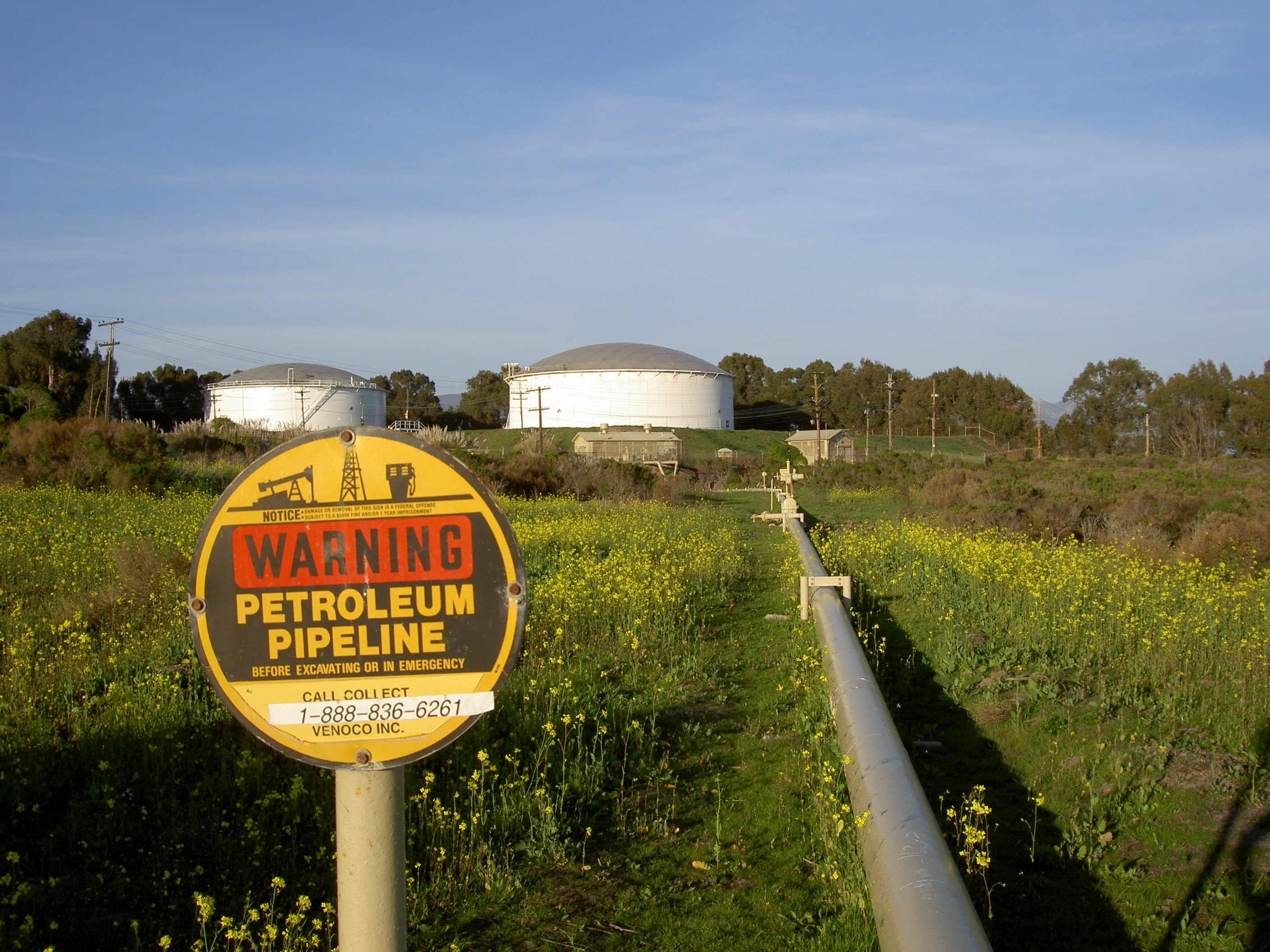
Oil storage tanks in Goleta in 2007

The estimate of $74 million financial impact over three years to the county includes approximately $37 million in lost property taxes, $32 million in lessened worker income and $5 million in reduced federal royalties. This is the result of the region's oil and gas industry being heavily dependent on Lines 901 and 903. Exxon's production In Santa Barbara was halted, and the company earned $216.6 million - below the estimated $636 million they had been anticipated to make. The seven offshore oil platforms that rely on the lines were forced to shut down when onshore storage tanks were filled. With the bankruptcy of Veneco, the state is looking at spending $58 million to begin dismantling Platform Holly. Truck transport of continuing production from the offshore platforms was not allowed by local agencies. Exceptions have been closely scrutinized by local officials such as allowing Venoco in August 2015 to transport crude oil that was already onshore by truck for a limited period. The oil had been evacuated from tanks and pipelines to allow maintenance of the onshore Ellwood facility in Goleta that serves Platform Holly.

On August 15, 2017, Plains submitted an application to the Energy and Minerals Division of Santa Barbara County Planning and Development for the replacement of Lines 901 and 903. The replacement pipeline would restore crude oil pipeline transportation service in Santa Barbara, San Luis Obispo and Kern Counties as the old pipelines can not be used.

ExxonMobil finished the environmental impact report in 2020 of a plan to truck oil. Phillips 66 Santa Barbara County refinery was the primary destination for the trucked oil but after the release of the report it was announced that it would be closing. The Planning Commission of Santa Barbara County rejected the proposal for 78 additional truck trips a day over the steep, narrow, and winding Highway 166 to the Pentland processing plant in the San Joaquin Valley.

=== Legislation ===
Three bills were signed into law in response to the spill. Under a new law, the California Fire Marshal will be required to review the oil pipelines conditions every year while federal regulations only mandate a review every five years. Another new law provides for making oil spill response times faster and more effective. Finally, a new law will force intrastate pipelines to use the best-known technology such as automatic shut-off valves. Another bill was signed into law in 2020 by Governor Gavin Newsom that increased the state's oil spill penalties for the first time in 30 years.

=== Regulations ===
The Pipeline Hazardous Material Safety Administration (PHMSA) is responsible for developing and enforcing regulations for pipeline operation transportation having been created in 2004 within the United States Department of Transportation. In the months following the spill, they found that the in-line inspection tool used by Plains in Line 901 and Line 903 had miscalculated the degree of corrosion. The company also withheld in-line inspection data so "it could enhance its interpretation of the data," according to a corrective order issued by PHMSA. In October, PHMSA proposed new rules to assist in preventing such inspection discrepancies.

== Restarting the pipeline ==
ExxonMobil acquired lines 901 and 903 from Plains All American Pipeline in 2022 through a subsidiary, Pacific Pipeline Company. Renamed the Las Flores Pipeline System, they are registered with the California Office of State Fire Marshall (OSFM) as CA-324 (formerly 901) and CA-325 (formerly 903). With the denial of permits to transport the oil by truck, the pipeline could enable ExxonMobil to restart its three platforms and the Santa Ynez Unit in Las Flores Canyon. Pacific Pipeline Company withdrew the application in 2023 to build a new pipeline as it planned to renovate and restart the existing lines. Sable Offshore Corp, formed to acquire the pipelines and the Santa Ynez Unit which includes the offshore oil platforms and the onshore processing facility, completes the transaction in early 2024. Financing for the $643 million sale included a $623 million loan from ExxonMobil which raised concern about the Sable's ability to handle the future expensive environmental cleanup and decommissioning facilities.

After reaching a settlement with the county of Santa Barbara allowing installation of 16 underground safety valves as required by the state fire marshal, Sable began construction along the pipeline. While Sable characterized this as maintenance and repairs, the California Coastal Commission issued a cease and desist order in late 2024 and told them coastal development permits were required.

The Harmony platform began oil production testing in 2025 and sent oil to the Las Flores Canyon facility with Sable reporting an extraction rate of about 6,000 barrels a day from six wells. In response to a request by Sable for federal regulatory oversight, the U.S. Department of Transportation approved the transfer of regulatory control in late December to the Pipeline and Hazardous Materials Safety Administration (PHMSA) from the state fire marshal. Due to the oil shortage during the Iran war, U.S. Energy Secretary Chris Wright directed Sable to restart the pipeline in March 2026 under the Defense Production Act. Sable started transporting oil through the pipeline from the onshore processing facility soon after the directive was issued. In August 2026, district judge Stephen Wilson fined Sable $1.5 million for violating a consent decree it inherited from Plains All American.

== See also ==
- California Coastal Commission
- 2021 Orange County oil spill
- List of oil spills
