= 2021 Orange County oil spill =

Pipeline leak on Southern California seabed

Orange County oil spill
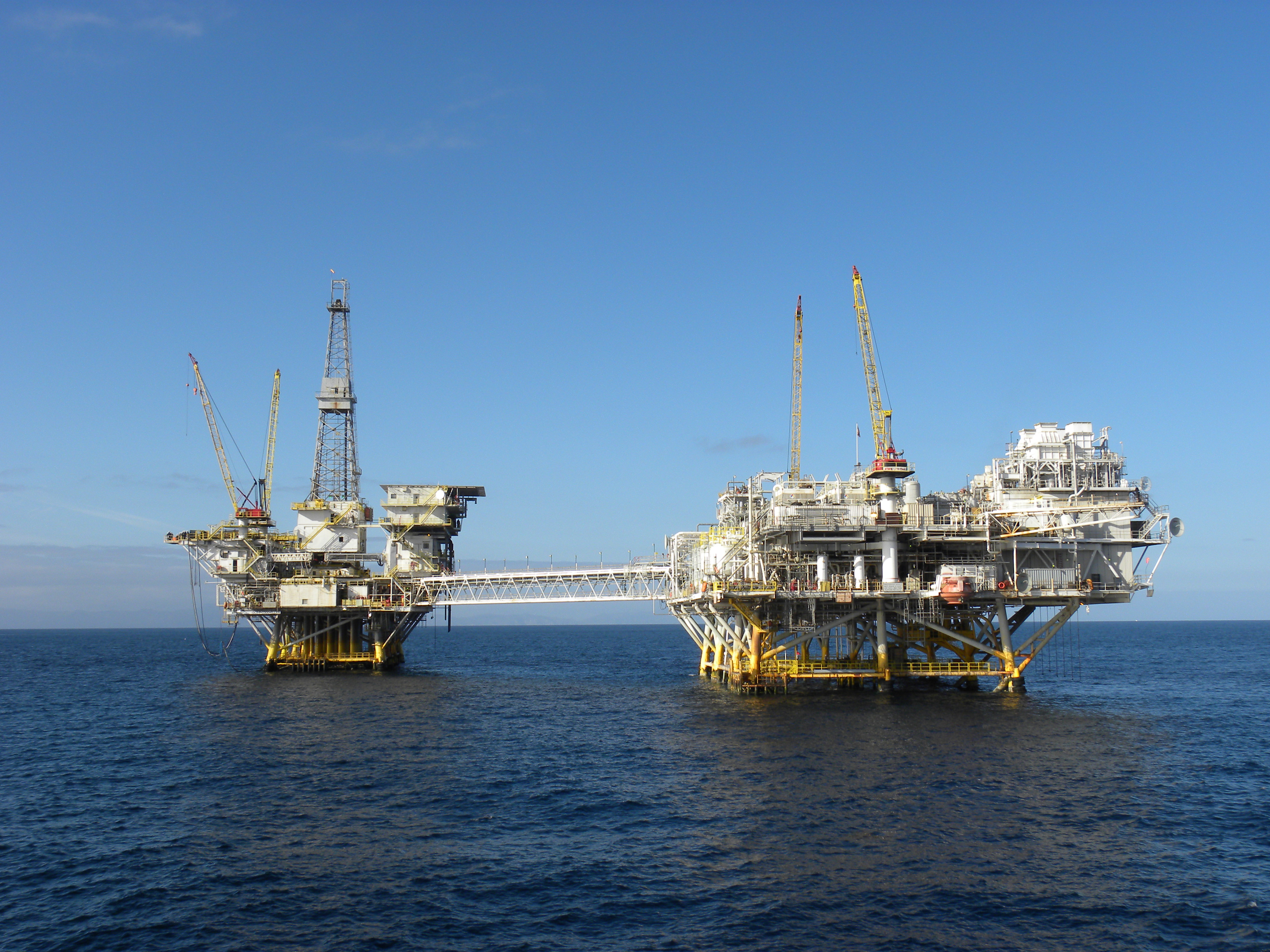
- Ellen and Elly oil platforms
- Interactive map of Orange County oil spill
- Location: Southern California
- Coordinates: 33°38′0″N 118°3′0″W
- Date: October 1, 2021

Cause
- Cause: Leaking pipeline on ocean floor
- Operator: Amplify Energy

Spill characteristics
- Volume: 25,000 U.S. gallons (600 barrels)
- Area: 8,320 acres (3,370 ha)
- Shoreline impacted: estimated 16 mi (26 km) damaged with tar balls dispersed much far south along the coast

On October 1, 2021, an oil spill deposited crude oil onto several Southern California beaches on the West Coast of the United States. While residents reported smelling fumes, a ship noticed an oil slick that evening and reported it to federal authorities. When oil from an underwater pipeline in the waters of coastal Orange County began washing ashore, officials in Huntington Beach closed the typically crowded beach in the evening of October 2. The U.S. Coast Guard estimated that spill covered 8,320 acres (3,370 ha) of the ocean's surface as they monitored it several times daily from the air. Investigations found a 17.7-mile (28.5 km) pipeline connecting offshore oil platforms with the shore had been displaced by being dragged by a ship's anchor.

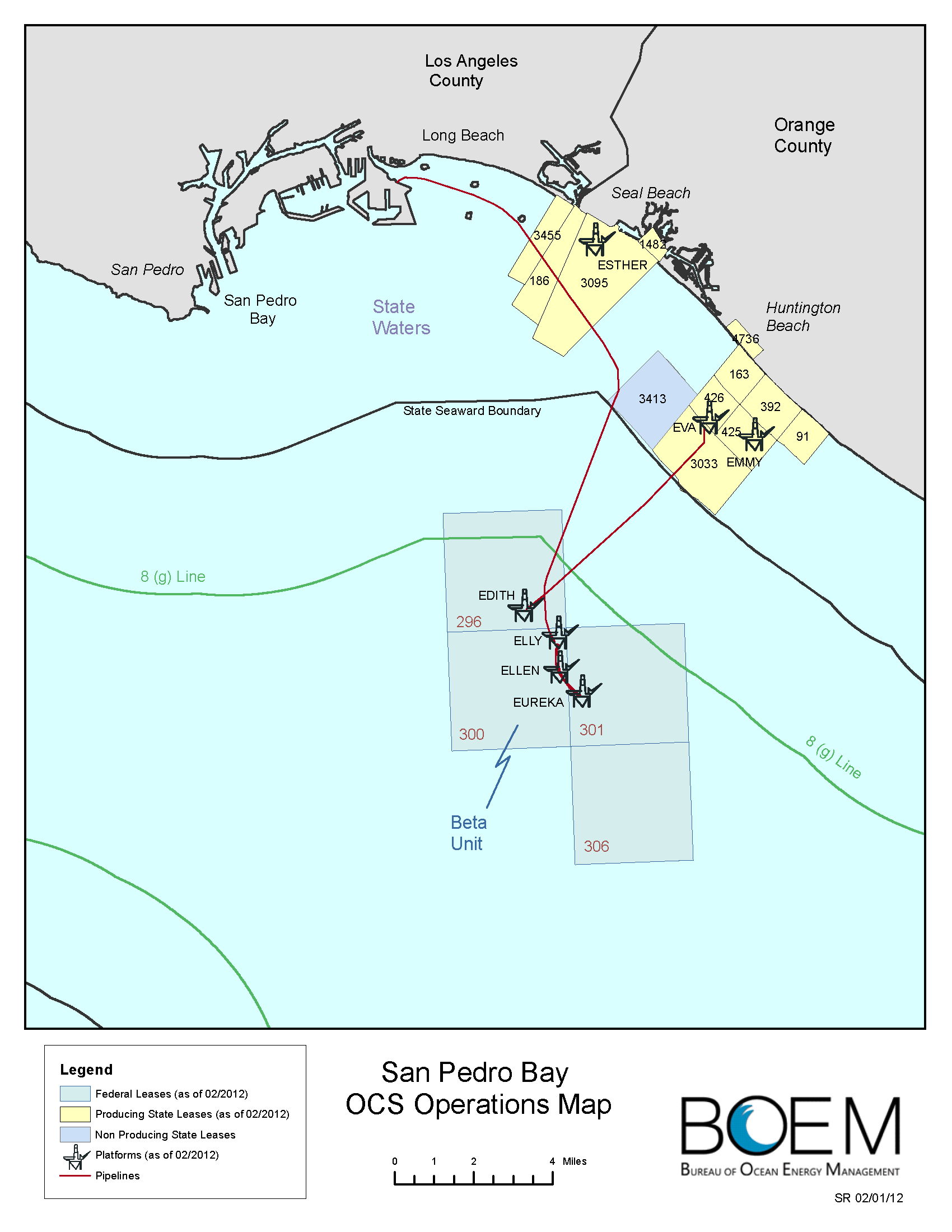
Oil platforms near Huntington Beach. The Elly well pipeline from the Beta Unit is the source of the 2021 oil spill. The four small islands shown in Long Beach Harbor are artificial islands for oil and gas wells.

Commercial divers found the pipeline had been displaced by about 105 ft (32 m) with a 13-inch (33 cm) split along the length of the pipe. Investigators suspect that two large container ships possibly dragged their anchors in this area during heavy winds on Jan. 25, 2021. An Orange County official compared the event to the 2015 Refugio oil spill in Santa Barbara County, which took months to clean up. Platform Elly pumps oil and gas to shore at the Port of Long Beach through this pipeline. The pipeline is operated by Beta Offshore, a Long Beach unit of Houston's Amplify Energy. The pipeline was repaired and returned to service in April 2023.

== Background ==
A consortium led by Royal Dutch Shell discovered the Beta field in 1976 in San Pedro Bay and built the platforms Elly and Ellen in 1980. The complex began producing in January 1981. In 1984, they added Eureka. Connected by pipelines, Ellen and Eureka have dozens of wells while Elly separates the water and natural gas from the crude oil. A 16-inch diameter pipeline (41 cm), laid upon the ocean floor for 17.7 miles (28.5 km), connects Elly with the shore. In 1999, a pipeline that carried oil, water and gas from the Eureka platform to Elly leaked about 2,000 U.S. gallons (50 barrels) of oil into the ocean due to corrosion. The platforms were set in the separation zone between the northbound and southbound lanes for container ships and other vessels entering and exiting the ports of Los Angeles and Long Beach, two of the world's busiest ports. Maritime officials tried to stop construction of the platforms. The Coast Guard raised objections, preferring that no platforms be built in the area. In 2000, the shipping lanes were relocated about one mile (1.6 km) west of the platforms as the newer deep draft vessels required significant room to maneuver.

The platforms are in federal waters overseen by the U.S. Department of the Interior. Beta Offshore, a subsidiary of Amplify Energy and current owner, pays royalties to the government in exchange for the lease on federal property as do other oil and gas companies. As these wells were no longer producing as much oil, the company received a $20-million “end of life” royalty discount for two years starting in July 2016. When it planned to drill four new wells, they received another royalty discount in June 2020.

== Detection and response ==
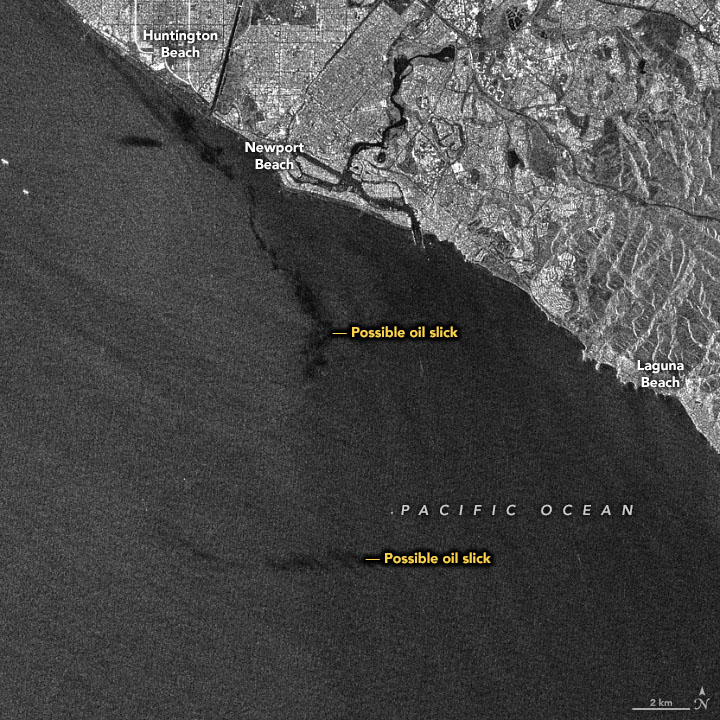
Oil slick in the Pacific Ocean on October 3, 2021

An alarm from a leak detection system sounded at 4:10 p.m. on October 1 and the operators shut down the pipeline. Believing that the system was providing false alarms for a leak at the platform, they began a series of restarting and stopping the flow of oil throughout the night. In the afternoon and evening of October 1, Huntington Beach and Newport Beach residents were already noticing a strong odor and called the police department to report the smell of oil fumes or hot roofing bitumen. Multiple calls concerning a possible spill north of the Huntington Beach Pier came in over a marine radio emergency channel from boats leaving the Pacific Airshow. The harbor patrol looked for the spill but found nothing on the water. In the evening, a foreign ship anchored off the coast reported a possible oil slick about 5 miles (8.0 km) west of Huntington Beach. A satellite image from the European Space Agency was reviewed by a National Oceanic and Atmospheric Administration analyst which confirmed a substance on the water which was most likely petroleum. The Marine Oil Spill Thickness (MOST) project also deployed Uninhabited Aerial Vehicle Synthetic Aperture Radar (UAVSAR) to assist by measuring the thickness of the oil spill from an aircraft. The National Response Center, staffed by United States Coast Guard officers and marine science technicians, is the sole federal point of contact for reporting all hazardous substances releases and oil spills. They forwarded the information to the Office of Spill Prevention and Response (OSPR), a division of the California Department of Fish and Wildlife charged with handling such emergencies. OSPR dispatched but encountered foggy conditions. The Coast Guard and Orange County Sheriff's Department flew out once the fog had lifted to the reported leak location to investigate. Control room operators on platform Elly shut down the pipeline at 6:01 a.m. on October 2 in response to a low-pressure alarm according to the Pipeline and Hazardous Materials Safety Administration after ignoring 83 alarms indicating the offshore pipeline was leaking for about 17 hours. They also failed to notify the Coast Guard until 9:07 a.m. The pipeline was suctioned at both ends to stop the flow of oil after it was shut down.

A full-scale mobilization effort was established with a Unified Command (ICS) which would eventually consist of the Coast Guard and the Office of Spill Prevention and Response with support from the cities of Long Beach, Newport Beach, Huntington Beach, the Orange County Sheriff's Department, and the county of San Diego together with the responsible party, Beta Offshore. The US Coast Guard estimated that spill covered 8,320 acres (3,370 ha) of the ocean's surface as they monitored it several times daily from the air. Officials characterized it as isolated ribbons of oil, or patches of oil rather than a big blob. Wind, waves and tides all help determine the impact of an oil slick. Generally mild conditions kept the bulk of the oil offshore, which is much simpler for crews to contain and clean up. The initial mobilization included mechanical equipment called skimmers that collect the oil on the surface of the water. Barriers called booms were also set up in the open ocean to try to stop the oil from spreading. The ocean currents pushed the plumes of oil south without large amounts entering the surf zone and fouling the beaches. Rocky coves along the coast south of Newport Beach which would have been difficult to clean were mainly spared. Cleanup efforts can damage the animals and plants that live there. During the days, workers in hazmat gear scoured the beaches to find and remove tar balls and any traces of damage from the spill. More than 1,300 workers were cleaning the shoreline in much of Orange County by October 9.

== Pipeline investigation ==
Platform Elly pumps crude oil through a 17.7-mile pipeline (28.5 km) which connects offshore oil platforms with the Port of Long Beach. The pipeline operator, Beta Offshore, a Long Beach unit of Houston's Amplify Energy, found the pipeline was intact during an inspection in October 2020. The investigation after the spill found that the pipeline had been displaced, possibly by being dragged by a ship's anchor. The pipeline at this point was at a depth of about 98 feet (30 m) about 5 miles (8.0 km) offshore. Contract divers and remotely-operated vehicles found a 4,000-foot (1,200 m) section of the pipeline had been pulled like a bowstring so that it was about 105 feet (32 m) out of place at its widest point with a 13-inch split (33 cm) aligned with the length of the pipe. They also confirmed that the split in the pipeline was no longer leaking. Initial investigations were of ships anchored closest to the pipeline the week before the spill such as the MV Rotterdam Express which was boarded by the Coast Guard. The investigation continued with particular interest in ships that were waiting to get into port and anchored outside an assigned anchorage or too close to a pipeline that was marked on nautical charts. Further inspection found marine growth around the displaced section of the pipeline indicating that the anchor drag was not a recent event. They are looking for an initial anchor strike which deflected the pipeline and stripped away its concrete casing without fracturing the pipeline. The pipeline would have been more vulnerable to additional stresses added later by another incident or geological events. Investigators focused on a storm that brought strong winds to the area for two days in late January 2021. Data was reviewed that shows every vessel that has been near the pipeline since October 2020. Investigators typically examine logs kept by the ships’ captains, officers and engineers, voyage data recorders, and parts of the ship such as the anchor. The investigation is open to the possibilities that the initial impact caused the leak, that the line was hit by something else at a later date or that the line failed due to a preexisting problem. On October 16, the 1,200-foot-long (370 m) container ship MSC Danit was boarded by the Coast Guard and National Transportation Safety Board marine casualty investigators in the Port of Long Beach. The ship operator Mediterranean Shipping Company, the ship owner Dordellas Finance Corporation, and others were designated as parties of interest in the investigation. On November 18, the 1,150-foot-long (350.55 m) container ship Beijing was boarded by the Coast Guard and National Transportation Safety Board marine casualty investigators in the Port of Long Beach. The ship operator, V-Ships Greece Ltd., and the ship owner, Capetanissa of Liberia, were designated as parties of interest in the investigation.

== Environmental effect ==
It only took a few hours for the oil to be up on the beach due to the short distance and the persistent westward and southwestern wind. The crude oil, like all Southern California oils, was extremely heavy, dark, and dense which tends to be more toxic than the lighter oils. Officials in Huntington Beach closed the typically crowded beach in the evening of October 2. By the morning of October 3, oil had already entered Talbert Marsh and other wetland areas of Huntington Beach. Crews worked to keep as much oil as possible out of ecologically sensitive areas with sand berms and floating booms. Oil that has entered an estuary and marsh habit cannot be cleaned up without causing more damage. It will eventually be sequestered by the sediment where it will take decades to degrade. These wetlands were restored in 1991 after having been severely degraded. Crude oil entered 127 acres (51 ha) of wetlands through an inlet to the ocean on a seven-foot high tide (2.1 m). The spill occurred right after nesting season and just before migratory birds come down so fewer birds were present than other seasons. Birds that gather in and around Huntington State Beach include gulls, willet, long-billed fletcher, Elegant terns and reddish egret. Forty-five birds were already dead when they arrived at the Oiled Wildlife Care Network. Exposure to oil weighs a bird down causing them to expend more energy to fly, float and maintain their body temperature. Instead of hunting for food on the water, they lie on the beach trying to stay warm. By October 12, wildlife officials had found 28 oil-covered birds which underwent a cleaning and rehabilitation program. A mixture of solvent, dish soap and warm water is used to remove the oil. Six of those birds died or were euthanized. Significant impacts can still occur to birds and marine life from the exposure that they get subtly through their diet or because of physical contact later on which might affect their physiology, their health and translate into a lower reproductive success.

South of Orange County, tar balls were found along the beaches in Oceanside, Carlsbad, Encinitas, and Del Mar, in San Diego County. Some of these beaches were reopened by October 7. By October 8, air quality in Orange County was back to normal and below California health standards for the pollutants that were measured. The oil platforms are home to millions of sea creatures, and the spill raised questions about whether they would survive. By November 6, about a third of the shoreline was nearing final cleanup approval as crews continued to collect tar balls along with sand, seaweed and driftwood tainted with oil.

== Economic impact ==
Businesses have experienced economic loss from the closure of beaches and harbors. This was peak season along this stretch of coastline where surfing is popular. Surf schools and surfboard rental business were unable to operate. Whale watching boats were not allowed to take customers out. Many of these businesses had been shuttered during the COVID-19 pandemic and had only recently reopened. The spill occurred during the second day of the Pacific Airshow, being held at Huntington Beach. Concern over public safety prompted officials to cancel the third and final day of the event. While crews continued combing the shores for vestiges of oil and tar, beaches were fully reopened on October 11 when water quality test results showed nondetectable amounts of oil contaminants.

A temporary ban on commercial and recreational fishing in an area that stretches about 20 miles (32 km) from Sunset Beach south to San Clemente and extends 6 miles (9.7 km) out to sea was put in place by the California Department of Fish and Wildlife. Local fish markets were impacted by public perception even though the fish were caught in safe areas miles away from the spill. The ban on the taking of fish and shellfish was lifted November 30. Some fisherman have joined lawsuits against Amplify. The Small Business Administration declared the county a disaster area on October 27. The low-interest loans provide access to funds while small businesses and nonprofits await reimbursement.

== Reactions ==
The spill increased discussion around the phaseout of offshore oil drilling, along with other forms of oil extraction, in California. An Orange County official compared the accident to the 2015 Refugio oil spill in Santa Barbara County, which took about four months to clean up. Governor Gavin Newsom declared a state of emergency in Orange County on October 4 to provide additional resources for the clean-up. Newsom held a news conference the next day at Bolsa Chica State Beach which had been closed after rangers noticed oil on the beach although the park is north of the heavily impacted beaches. Newsom stated that California now boasts more clean energy jobs than fossil fuel-based employment. He also mentioned that the damage caused by the oil spill did not reach a threshold that would prompt asking for a national disaster declaration. He later thanked the Biden administration for the disaster declaration by the Small Business Administration that provided bridge loans for impacted businesses.

A hearing of the House of Representatives Subcommittee on Energy and Mineral Resources and the Natural Resources Subcommittee on Oversight and Investigations was held on October 18 to discuss the effects of the oil spill on the environment and local economy. Speakers at a rally in Laguna Beach on October 18 called for an end to offshore oil drilling emphasizing that beaches up and down the coastline account for $44 billion a year in the economy and employ over a half-million Californians. Actions advocated by some lawmakers and environmentalists include prohibiting all future offshore drilling and extending the ban to companies already operating in state and federal waters. The California State Lands Commission halted further leasing in state waters within three miles of the coastline after the Santa Barbara oil spill in 1969. Since 1984, no new offshore oil drilling has been approved in federal waters off California. In response to a proposal by the Trump administration in 2018 to open offshore oil and natural gas reserves for exploration, California passed laws barring the construction of pipelines, piers, wharves or other infrastructure necessary to transport the oil and gas from federal waters to state land.

The U.S. Army Corps of Engineers granted the approval in September 2022 for rebuilding the pipeline. The line was put back in service in April 2023.

== Liability and lawsuits ==
Amplify is responsible for the cost of the clean up. The Oil Pollution Act of 1990 requires whoever spills the oil to pay for the cleanup although they can later seek to recover its losses from other liable parties. Businesses can file reimbursement claims that are paid by the party deemed responsible for the spill. If the wells are shut down, some of the legal responsibility for decommissioning the wells could fall to Shell or other past owners. Lawsuits began being filed in early October and more were expected. Fisherman joined lawsuits against Amplify due to the extended closure of the fishing grounds.

In August 2022, Amplify announced it would plead guilty to one count of misdemeanor negligent discharge of oil related to the leak in federal court. Amplify said it would pay a fine of about $7 million over three years and reimburse almost $6 million to government agencies including the U.S. Coast Guard. As part of the proposed agreement, the company will also install a new leak detection system. Amplify Energy and two of its subsidiaries agreed to enter no contest pleas to killing birds and water pollution in a settlement with the county and state officials in September. In 2022, a proposed claim settlement of $956,352 by Amplify was accepted by the Orange County Board of Supervisors over the costs of dealing with the oil spill. The city of Huntington Beach filed a separate claim. The city lawsuit includes losses from the cancellation of the Pacific Airshow. Amplify announced it had reached an agreement in principle to resolve all civil claims with more than a dozen businesses and residents that brought a class-action suit with payment through their insurance company. The $50 million settlement included $34 million for those in the fishing industry, $9 million for homeowners and $7 million for tourism-related companies.

Two major shipping companies were sued by Amplify Energy for damages. Switzerland-based Mediterranean Shipping Co. and Capetanissa Maritime Corp., a subsidiary of Greek shipping giant Costamare, were allegedly responsible for dragging ship anchors over the pipeline and weakening it during a storm. The shipping companies reached an $85 million settlement with Amplify. The companies also agreed to pay $45 million to those in the fishing industry, property owners and tourism-related companies that had settled with Amplify. Amplify also filed a lawsuit against the Marine Exchange of Southern California claiming they should have been aware of the anchor drags and notified the company.

In May 2023, the Pipeline and Hazardous Materials Safety Administration proposed fining the company nearly $3.4 million for safety violations during the spill.
