= Danit-class container ship =

Container ship class

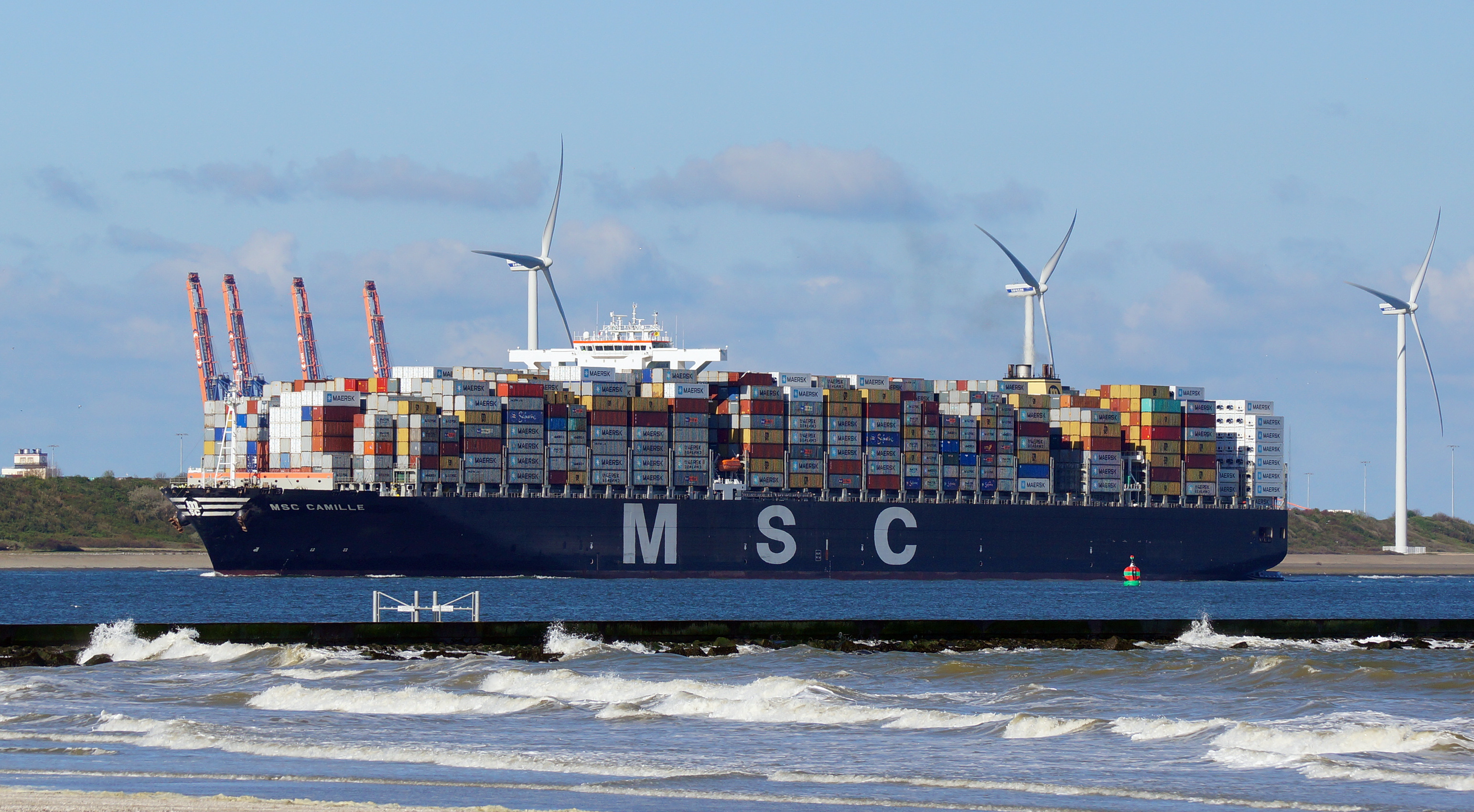
- MSC Camille in the port of Rotterdam

Class overview
- Builders: Daewoo Shipbuilding and Marine Engineering
- Operators: Mediterranean Shipping Company
- In service: 2009–present
- Planned: 23
- Completed: 23
- Active: 23

General characteristics (First series)
- Type: Container ship
- Tonnage: 153,092 GT
- Length: 365.5 m (1,199 ft 2 in)
- Beam: 51.3 m (168 ft 4 in)
- Draught: 16 m (52 ft 6 in)
- Capacity: 14,028 TEU

General characteristics (Second series)
- Type: Container ship
- Tonnage: 153,115 GT
- Length: 365.5 m (1,199 ft 2 in)
- Beam: 51.3 m (168 ft 4 in)
- Draught: 16 m (52 ft 6 in)
- Capacity: 14,036 TEU

General characteristics (Third series)
- Type: Container ship
- Tonnage: 143,521 GT
- Length: 365.8 m (1,200 ft 2 in)
- Beam: 48.4 m (158 ft 10 in)
- Draught: 16 m (52 ft 6 in)
- Capacity: 13,050 TEU

The Danit class is a series of 23 container ships built by Daewoo Shipbuilding & Marine Engineering in South Korea. The ships have a maximum theoretical capacity of 13,050 to 14,036 twenty-foot equivalent units (TEU).

== List of ships ==
Ship	Yard number	IMO number	Delivery	Status	ref
First Series (14,028 TEU)
MSC Danit	4135	9404649	26 Mar 2009	In service	
MSC Camille	4136	9404651	1 Jul 2009	In service	
MSC Sonia	4137	9404663	15 Apr 2010	In service	
MSC Melatilde	4138	9404675	23 Jun 2010	In service	
MSC Paloma	4139	9441001	19 Aug 2010	In service	
Second Series (14,036 TEU)
MSC Savona	4178	9460356	19 Mar 2010	In service	
MSC Alexandra	4179	9461374	1 Apr 2010	In service	
MSC Genova	4180	9461386	16 Jun 2010	In service	
MSC La Spezia	4182	9461403	22 Oct 2010	In service	
MSC Livorno	4184	9461427	13 Dec 2010	In service	
MSC Rosa M	4181	9461398	20 Dec 2010	In service	
MSC Bari	4186	9461441	31 Jan 2011	In service	
MSC Teresa	4195	9469560	10 Mar 2011	In service	
MSC Taranto	4196	9475358	26 May 2011	In service	
MSC Ravenna	4198	9484431	27 Jul 2011	In service	
MSC Clorinda	4197	9484429	5 Jan 2012	In service	
MSC Deila	4183	9461415	23 Apr 2012	In service	
MSC Valeria	4185	9461439	13 Jun 2012	In service	
Third Series (13,050 TEU)
MSC Rapallo	4200	9484455	6 Oct 2011	In service	
MSC Trieste	4202	9484479	1 Dec 2011	In service	
MSC Ariane	4199	9484443	18 Jan 2012	In service	
MSC Aurora	4203	9484481	7 Mar 2012	In service	
MSC Vandya	4201	9484467	15 Mar 2012	In service	
