= MV Rotterdam Express =

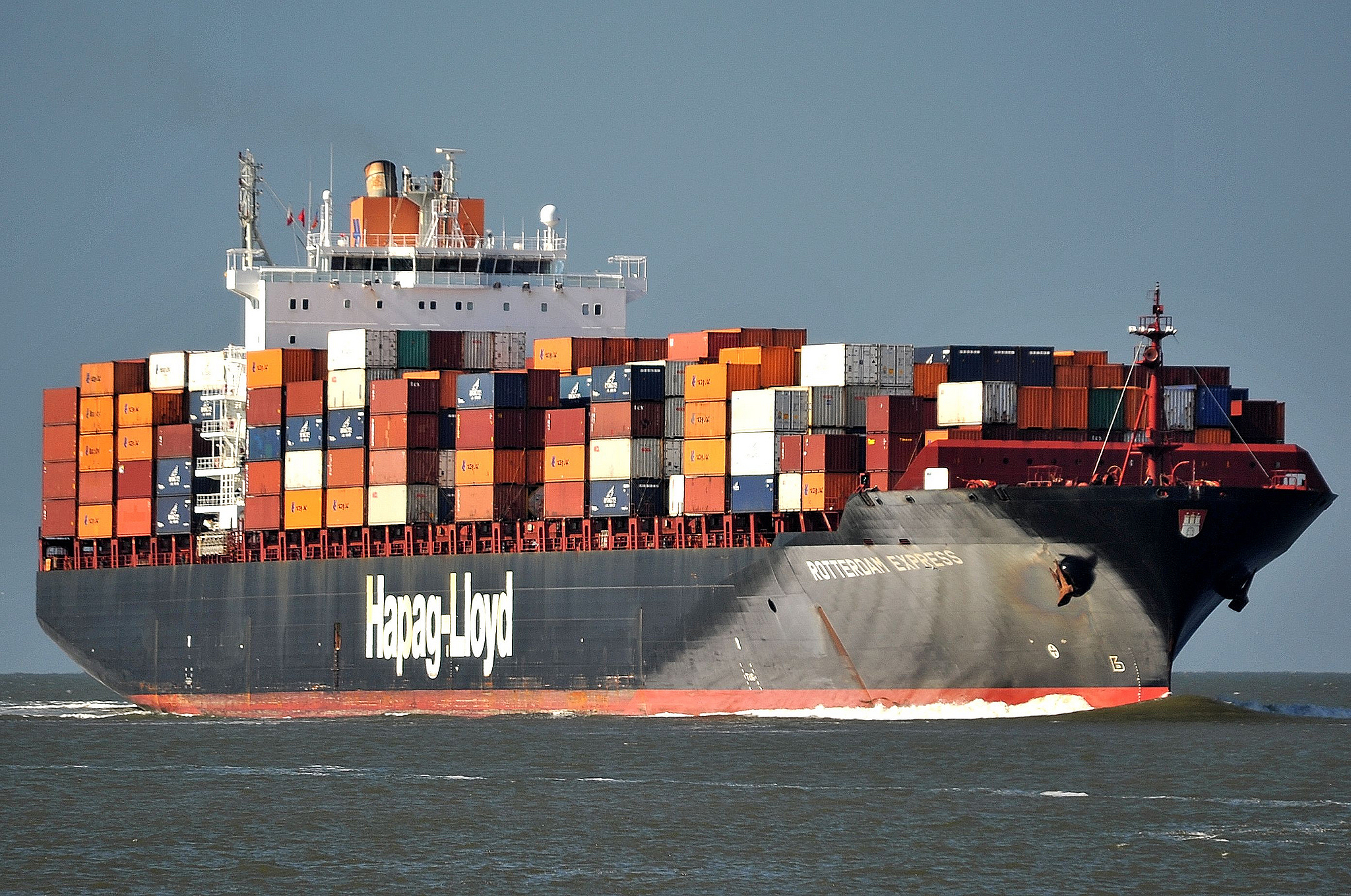

History
- Name: Rotterdam Express
- Owner: HL-4160 Chartering
- Operator: Hapag-Lloyd
- Port of registry: Germany
- Launched: 10 June 2000
- Identification: Call sign: DMRX; IMO number: 9193317

General characteristics
- Tonnage: 54,465 GT; 66,975 DWT
- Length: 294 metres (965 ft)
- Beam: 32 metres (105 ft)

MV Rotterdam Express is a container ship built in 2000 and in the Hapag-Lloyd fleet as of 2021.

Sister ships in the Dallas Express class include the lead ship Dallas Express, Seoul Express, and Tokyo Express.

== History ==
In 2018, the ship was boarded by Colombian Navy and police forces near Cartagena, after being informed of ten stowaways by the captain. During the course of investigating the containers, 185 kg of cocaine were found and seized.

The ship was boarded by the United States Coast Guard in October 2021 in part of the investigation of the Orange County, California oil pipeline break and spill.

On 23 May 2025, Hapag-Lloyd christened a new 400-meter long container vessel also named Rotterdam Express (IMO number: 9943891).
