= Naples Reef =

Reef off the Gaviota Coast of Santa Barbara County, California

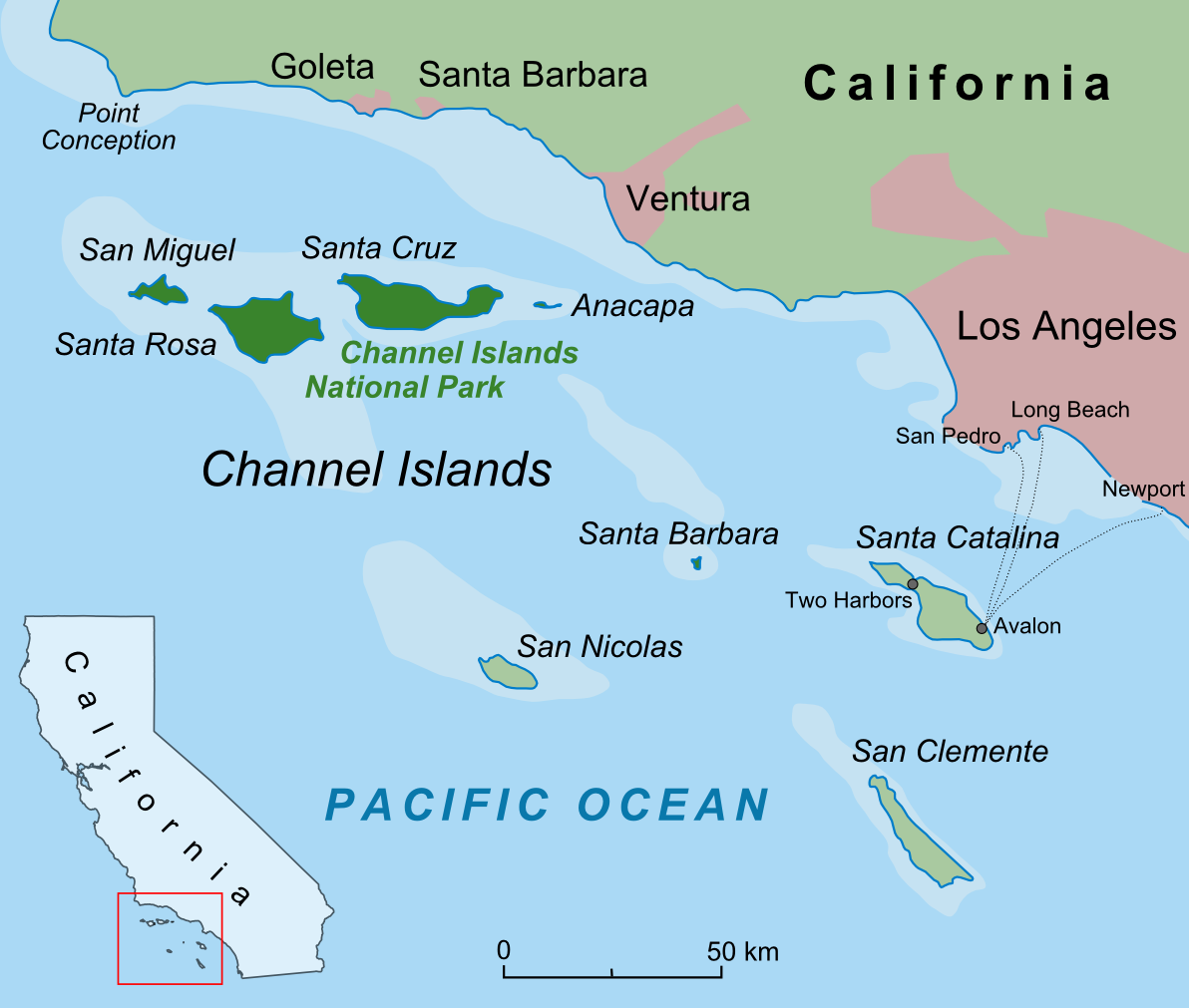
- Location within California Location within USA California Channel Islands Location within Pacific Ocean

Location
- Location: Pacific Ocean
- Coordinates: 34.4147165°N 119.9356946°W
- Country: United States

Geology
- Type: fringing reef

Naples Reef is a fringing reef located off the Gaviota Coast of Santa Barbara County, California in the Naples marine preserve. It is an underwater pinnacle and cave system that is a popular scuba diving and free diving area. There are fishing restrictions in place, however recreational take by spearfishing of white seabass and pelagic finfish is allowed.

== Ecology ==
Naples Reef is a rich, productive habitat, with sea anemone-covered underwater walls rising 30-feet from the sea floor and a kelp forest that supports various fish and wildlife. White seabass, kelp bass, rockfish, colorful nudibranchs, red gorgonians, pelicans, harbor seals and a variety of crabs, lobster and scallops all share the reef. This coastal area is home to many threatened and endangered animals such as the steelhead trout, the tidewater goby, the white-tailed kite, and the red-legged frog.

== Environmental concerns ==
Naples reef faces a variety of threats including coastal development and climate change. It is one of the most biologically productive locations in all of Southern California and despite being a mainland reef, it is ecologically more connected to the northern Channel Islands.

Naples State Marine Conservation Area (SMCA) is a marine protected area that protects Naples Reef which is about three-quarters of a mile offshore along the middle of the pristine and rural Gaviota Coast in Santa Barbara County on California’s south coast. The SMCA covers 2.58 square miles. The MPAs protects marine life by limiting the removal of wildlife from within its borders.

== Cultural concerns ==
The area has immense historic and cultural importance for local Native American tribes. The federally recognized tribe of Santa Ynez Band of Chumash Indians is exempt from fish take regulations but shall comply with all other existing regulations and statutes. The United States Department of the Interior has declared the adjacent undeveloped coastline "globally significant".

== See also ==
- Santa Barbara Channel
- Channel Islands (California)
