= MSC Camille =

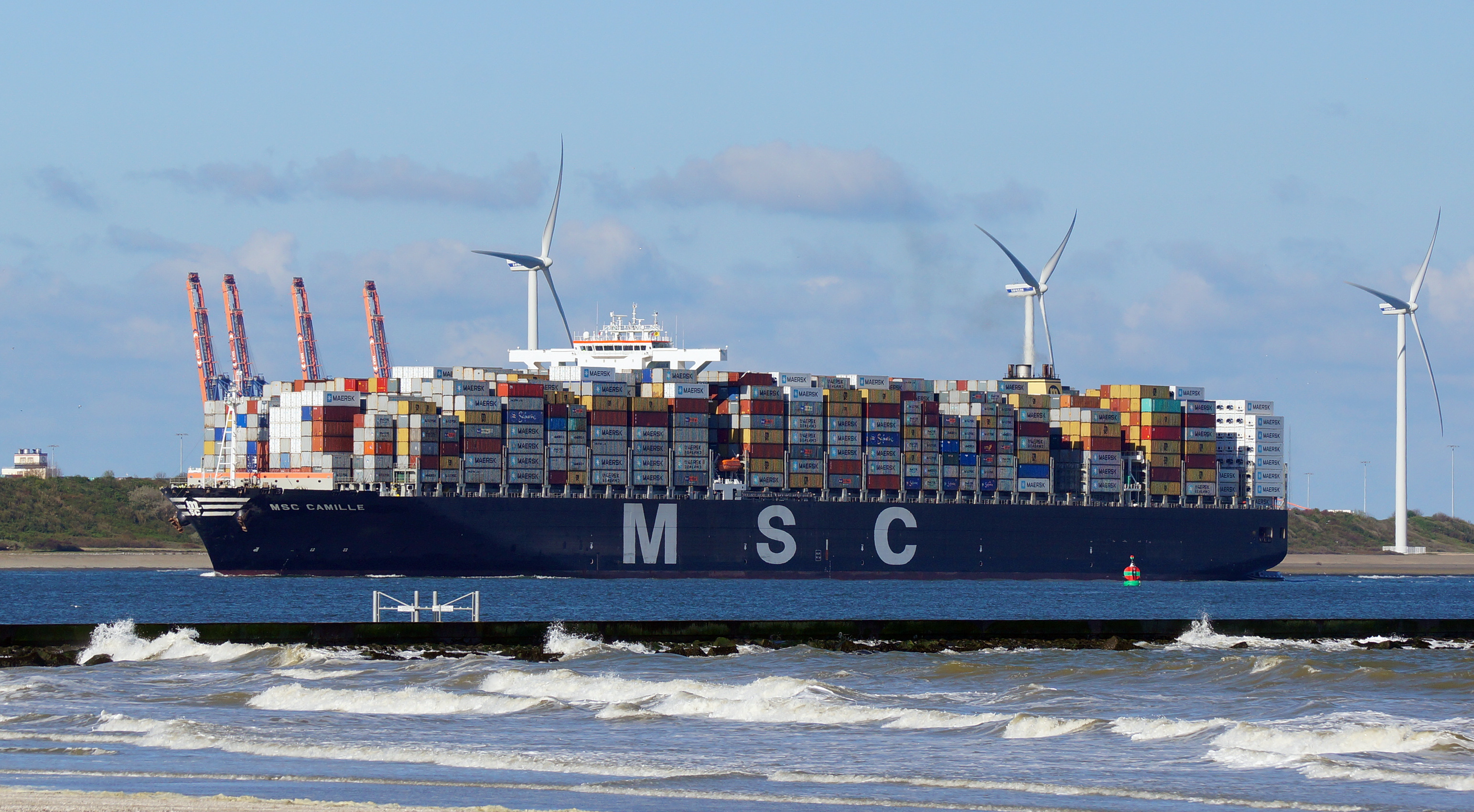
- Nieuwe Waterweg-Maasmond, 04/27/2015

History
- Name: MSC Camille
- Owner: Veldus Holding SA
- Operator: MSC Mediterranean shipping Co SA
- Port of registry: Panama Panama
- Builder: Daewoo Shipbuilding & Marin Engineering Co Ltd - Geoje
- Yard number: 4136
- Completed: 2009
- Identification: IMO number: 9404651; MMSI number: 354625000; Callsign: 3FQT9; Official number: 4064109
- Status: In service

General characteristics
- Class & type: MSC Danit-class container ship
- Tonnage: 153,092 GT 165,644 DWT
- Length: 365 m
- Beam: 51 m
- Draught: 11.95 m
- Installed power: 72,240 kW(98,218hp)
- Propulsion: 1x2 stroke 12 Cy.
- Speed: 25 knots
- Capacity: 14,000 TEU

== Hull and engine ==
MSC Camille was built by Daewoo Shipbuilding & Marine Engineering Co in yard number 4136. It is a fully cellular container ship. She can hold up to 14,000 Twenty-foot equivalent units, which makes it one of the biggest container ships in the world. The ship is 365.52m in length and has a 51m beam. MSC Camille as a total output of 98,218 hp. She is also equipped with two tunnel thrusters for better maneuverability in and out of ports.

== Illegal goods ==
A January 2010 inspection of MSC Camille found 1.5 tonnes of illegally imported goods from China to Teesport. Some of them were from animal origin (about 200 boxes), noodles, milk, sweets, and other food. All the items were destroyed.

== Vessel collision ==
On June 20, 2010, Torm Marina (110,000 DWT) was struck by the container ship MSC Camille, 48 miles east of Gibraltar. MSC Camille struck the Torm Marina in the bow, cracking the hull from deck to keel. At time of the collision the Torm Marina had no cargo and no oil stored in effected tanks, avoiding a potential disaster in the Strait of Gibraltar. No injuries were reported.
