= Pacific Airshow =

Airshow in Queensland, Australia and California

- Thunderbirds flying over Pacific Airshow Huntington Beach, 2023
- Status: Active
- Frequency: Annual
- Country: United States; Australia
- Inaugurated: Huntington Beach, California: 2016; Gold Coast, Queensland: 2023
- Previous event: Huntington Beach: October 4–6, 2024; Gold Coast: August 16–18, 2024
- Next event: Huntington Beach: October 2–4, 2026; Gold Coast: August 14–16, 2026
- Major events: Military demonstrations; Civilian aerobatic displays; Activations and exhibits; Performer signing sessions
- Website: pacificairshow.com

Pacific Airshow is an annual airshow held in Huntington Beach, California, and Gold Coast, Queensland. Pacific Airshow is the most attended airshow in both the United States and Australia.

The event has a focus on military aviation, previously featuring aircraft from the United States Air Force, United States Navy, United States Marine Corps, United States Army, Royal Air Force, Royal Canadian Air Force, and Royal Australian Air Force.

Spanning over three days, the Airshow features the best in military demonstrations from teams, including past performances by the U.S. Air Force Thunderbirds, U.S. Navy Blue Angels,F-35 Lighting II Demo Team,F-22 Raptor Demo Team, Royal Air Force Red Arrows, Canadian Forces Snowbirds, and the Royal Australian Air Force Roulettes.

The Huntington Beach event has become a popular fall event for residents and visitors from as far away as Australia, Europe, and Asia while delivering a more than $105 million economic impact to the city of Huntington Beach, California.

== History ==
The first Pacific Airshow took place in 2016 in Huntington Beach, California, attracting hundreds of thousands to Huntington Beach for a display of aviation skill and military might soaring over the beach in Southern California. The annual Huntington Beach event was cancelled in 2020 due to COVID-19 and the third day of the 2021 event due to the Huntington Beach oil spill. The Pacific Airshow Gold Coast inaugural event was held in 2023.

== Awards ==
In seven event years, Pacific Airshow has been recognized as the Civilian Air Show Site of the Year by the U.S. Air Force Thunderbirds in 2018, 2019 and 2022.

Pacific Airshow has been named among the Top 3 Air Shows by USA Today’s 10 Best Airshows twice, Top 5 Air Shows once and Top 10 Air Shows once.
