= MSC Danit =

MSC Danit-class container ship

History

Panama
- Name: MSC Danit
- Operator: Mediterranean Shipping Company S.A.
- Yard number: 4135
- Launched: 27 December 2008
- Status: Currently in service
- Notes: IMO number: 9404649; MMSI number: 357051000; Callsign: 3FZU8

General characteristics
- Class & type: MSC Danit-class container ship
- Tonnage: 165,517 metric tons (deadweight tonnage); 153,092 gross tons
- Length: 365.50 m (1,199.1 ft)
- Beam: 51.20 m (168.0 ft)
- Draft: 16 m (52 ft)
- Propulsion: MAN B&W 12K98MC-C engine; 72,240 kW
- Speed: 25.0 knots (46 km/h) (maximum); 24.1 knots (45 km/h) (cruising)
- Capacity: 14,000 (maximum) TEU Capacity; 10,060 TEU (capacity at 14t TEU); 1,000 TEU (reefer containers)
- Crew: 25

MSC Danit is a large container ship. The ship was ordered by Mediterranean Shipping Company S.A. and finished at the beginning of March 2009. The ship was built at Daewoo Shipbuilding & Marine Engineering Ltd, South Korea under yard number 4135, for Dordellas Finance Corp., Panama.

== Design ==
MSC Danit is a relatively new "New Panamax"-sized container ship. The ship has an overall length of 365.50 m (1,199.1 ft); a moulded beam of 51.20 m (168.0 ft); a maximum draft of 16.00 m (52.49 ft); a deadweight tonnage of 165,517 tonnes; measures 153,092 gross tons; and cargo capacity of 14,000 TEUs. Daewoo made some innovations in the ship's design, placing the superstructure in the midships and the engine room and funnels at the rear - this gives better stability and lower trim for a higher speed when the ship is fully loaded. The ship is owned by Dordellas Finance Corp., Panama (Management & Operated by MSC Mediterranean Shipping Co SA, avenue Eugene-Pittard, 40, 1206 Geneva, Switzerland.)

MSC Danit is the first ship of a class of 23 container ships.

== Engine ==
The main engine of the container ship is a MAN B&W 12K98MC-C with a full power output of 72,240 kW. This is enough power for the ship to reach a maximum speed of 25 knots.

== Christening ==
The ship was named on 26 March 2009 by the vice-president of Daewoo Shipbuilding & Marine Engineering Ltd, the president of MSC Israel, Edni Simkin, and his daughter Danit after whom the ship was named.

== Incidents ==
On 16 October 2021, the ship was boarded in the Port of Long Beach by the United States Coast Guard and National Transportation Safety Board marine casualty investigators. They were investigating an undersea pipeline that appeared to have been damaged by a ship's anchor and recently spilled oil onto the beaches of Orange County. MSC and ship owner, Dordellas Finance Corporation, and others were designated as parties of interest in the investigation.
