= Naples State Marine Conservation Area =

Marine protected area in Santa Barbara County, California

Naples State Marine Conservation Area (SMCA) is a marine protected area that protects Naples Reef which is about three-quarters of a mile offshore along the middle of the pristine and rural Gaviota Coast in Santa Barbara County on California’s south coast. The SMCA covers 2.58 square miles. The MPAs protects marine life by limiting the removal of wildlife from within its borders.

Naples SMCA prohibits take of living marine resources except: recreational take of pelagic finfish, including Pacific bonito and white seabass by spearfishing is allowed; commercial take of giant kelp (Macrocystis pyrifera) by hand harvest is allowed, or by mechanical harvest is allowed only under the following condition: Duplicate landing records must be kept on board the harvest vessel in accordance with the requirements of Section 165. Take pursuant to operation and maintenance of artificial structures inside the conservation area is allowed pursuant to any required federal, state and local permits, or as otherwise authorized by the department. Please see the following for official details on boundaries, regulations and other information:

== History ==
Naples SMCA is one of 36 marine protected areas adopted by the California Fish and Game Commission in December, 2010 during the third phase of the Marine Life Protection Act Initiative. The MLPAI is a collaborative public process to create a statewide network of protected areas along California’s coastline.

The south coast’s new marine protected areas were designed by local divers, fishermen, conservationists and scientists who comprised the South Coast Regional Stakeholder Group. Their job was to design a network of protected areas that would preserve sensitive sea life and habitats while enhancing recreation, study and education opportunities.

The south coast marine protected areas went into effect in 2012.

== Geography and natural features ==
Naples SMCA is a marine protected area that protects Naples Reef which is located about three-quarters of a mile offshore along the middle of the pristine and rural Gaviota Coast in Santa Barbara County on California’s south coast.

The Naples SMCA is bounded by the mean high tide line and straight lines connecting the following points in the order listed:

1. 34°26.51′N 119°58.00′W
2. 34°25.00′N 119°58.00′W
3. 34°25.00′N 119°56.00′W and
4. 34°26.13′N 119°56.00′W.

== Habitat and wildlife ==
This small MPA has been designed to provide protection for a highly productive, unique offshore rocky reef with exceptional substrate diversity and relief, low-impact rural adjacent land uses, intertidal areas, surfgrass, kelp forest, and a harbor seal haulout. It features a pinnacle-and-ledge reef network.

== Recreation and nearby attractions ==
Naples Reef has drawn praise from California Diving News as among the most scenic coastal dives available in southern California. Access via small boat or kayak is possible from either El Capitan State Beach to the north or from the Bacara Resort to the south – each requires a several mile trip over water. Recently, the adjacent Santa Barbara Ranch relaxed access rules so that a lengthy overland access to the coastal section of the protected area is possible, although routes and trails are informal and require a hazardous cliff descent. On the reef, diving and snorkeling are fantastic as the complex bottom structure hosts an extraordinary diversity of marine life. Surge and current are often significant however. Shoreline visits feature spectacular tidepooling along low tide-exposed “hog back” reef areas, and a Harbor Seal colony has appeared recently along the shore. Points and reefs nearshore can produce rideable surf in the right conditions as well.

Natural recreational opportunities are the mainstay along the Gaviota Coast, with a string of State Parks and Beaches dotting this rural, agricultural coastline. Refreshments and minimal supplies are available in-season at the El Capitan and Refugio State Beaches, which also provide beach and hiking opportunities. Urban amenities are virtually absent beyond a 15-mile drive south to the greater Santa Barbara area.

Naples SMCA prohibits the take of all living marine resources except that recreational spearfishing for pelagic species including white seabass is permitted, as is kelp harvesting. However, California’s marine protected areas encourage recreational and educational uses of the ocean. Activities such as kayaking, diving, snorkeling, and swimming are allowed.

== Scientific monitoring ==
As specified by the Marine Life Protection Act, selected marine protected areas along California’s south coast are being monitored by scientists to track their effectiveness and learn more about ocean health. Similar studies in marine protected areas located off the Santa Barbara Channel Islands have already detected gradual improvements in fish size and number.

== See also ==
- Naples Reef
