= COSCO Beijing =

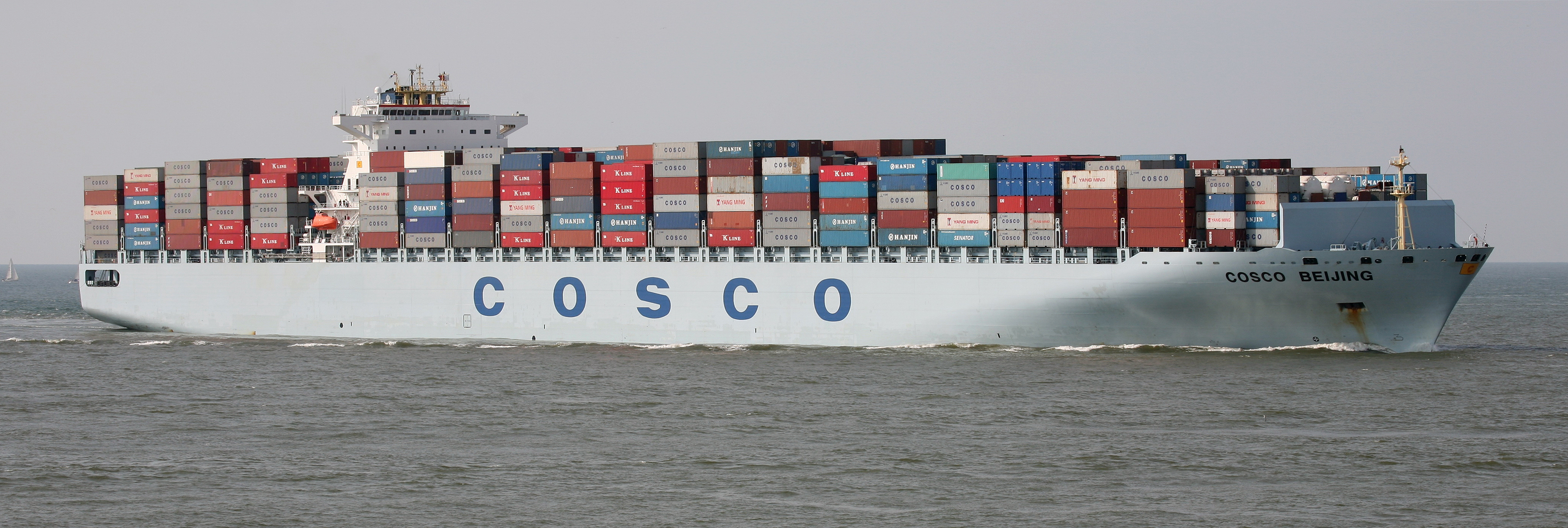
- COSCO Beijing

History
- Name: Beijing
- Owner: Capetanissa Maritime Corp
- Port of registry: Malta
- Builder: Hyundai Heavy Industries Co., Ltd., Ulsan, South Korea
- Yard number: 1653
- Launched: 14 April 2006
- Completed: 2006
- Identification: IMO number: 9308508; MMSI number: 256937000; Callsign: 9HA4041
- Status: In service

General characteristics
- Class & type: (A33A2CC) container Ship (Fully Cellular)
- Tonnage: 109,149 gross register tons
- Length: 350.57 m (1,150.2 ft)
- Beam: 43.0 m (141.1 ft)
- Height: 64.48 m
- Draught: 15 m
- Depth: 27.30 m
- Decks: 1dks
- Installed power: 74,760kW(101,748hp)
- Speed: 25.4 knots (47.0 km/h; 29.2 mph)
- Capacity: 9469 TEU

COSCO Beijing is a container ship built in 2006, by Hyundai Heavy Industries Co., Ltd. in South Korea. Beijing is owned by Capetanissa Maritime Corp of Greece, and operated by COSCO Container Lines Co Ltd (COSCON).

== Hull and engine ==
Beijing is a GL class ship, with a length of 350.55 m (1,150.1 ft). She has one oil engine driving 1FP propeller, AuxGen 2 × 2,800 kW (3,800 hp) a.c., 3 × 2,200 kW (3,000 hp) a.c. Beijing has a service speed of 19 kn (35 km/h; 22 mph). The fastest recorded speed on Beijing was 21.3 kn (39.4 km/h; 24.5 mph)

== Incidents ==
On 18 November 2021, the ship was boarded in the Port of Long Beach by the United States Coast Guard and National Transportation Safety Board marine casualty investigators. They were investigating an undersea pipeline that may have been damaged by a ship's anchor and had shortly before spilled oil onto the beaches of Orange County. The ship's owners, Capetanissa of Liberia and the operator V-Ships Greece Ltd. were designated as parties of interest in the investigation.
