= Mitsui O.S.K. Lines =

Japanese shipping company

Mitsui O.S.K. Lines, Ltd.

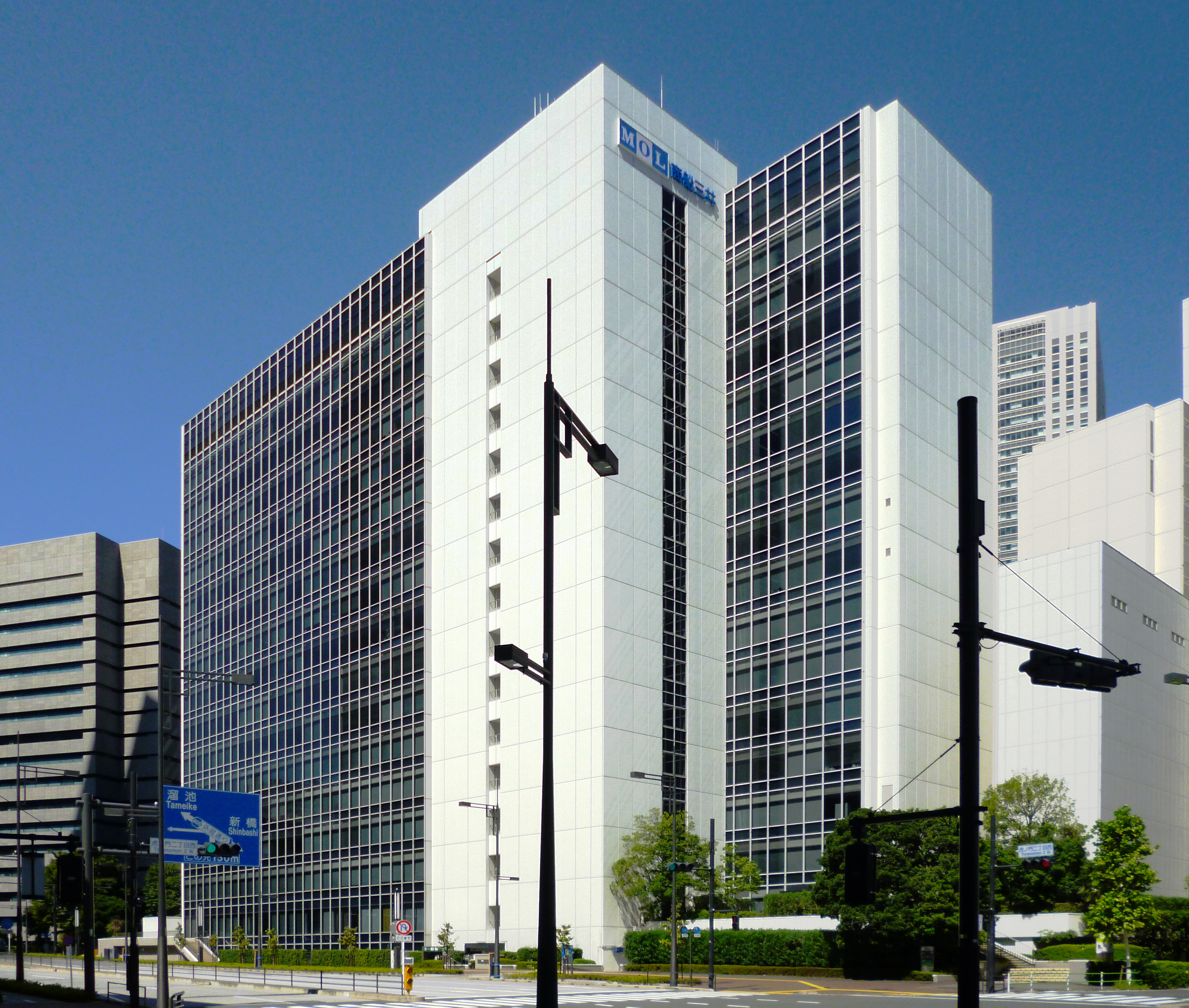
- MOL headquarters in Toranomon, Tokyo
- Native name: 株式会社商船三井
- Type: Public (KK)
- Traded as: TYO: 9104
- Industry: Transport
- Founded: 1884; 142 years ago
- Headquarters: Toranomon, Minato, Tokyo, Japan
- Area served: Worldwide
- Revenue: ▲1,775 billion yen (US$12.503 billon) (FY2024)
- Net income: ▲425.5 billion yen (US$3.00 billion) (FY2024)
- Number of employees: 8,547
- Website: www.mol.co.jp

Mitsui O.S.K. Lines (Japanese: 株式会社商船三井, romanized: Kabushiki-gaisha Shōsen Mitsui; abbreviated MOL) is a Japanese transport company headquartered in Toranomon, Minato, Tokyo, Japan. It is one of the largest shipping companies in the world and the largest tanker owning and operating company in the world.

Founded as a key part of the Mitsui zaibatsu (family-owned conglomerate) during the early industrialization of Japan, the company remains part of the Mitsui keiretsu (group of aligned companies) after the dissolution of the zaibatsu in the post-war period.

MOL fleet includes dry cargo ships (bulk carriers), liquefied natural gas carriers, Ro-Ro Car Carrier ships, oil tankers, container ships (among which mv MOL Triumph is the 4th largest containership in the world), and container terminals. The company's container shipping operations were merged with those of NYK Line and K Line and rebranded as Ocean Network Express in April 2018, with MOL holding a 31% stake in the joint venture.

MOL is also active in passenger shipping. MOL Cruises operates cruise ships such as the MS Nippon Maru and MS Mitsui Ocean Fuji, with three more large vessels expected to join the fleet by the end of the 2020s. MOL's subsidiary, MOL Sunflower, operates daily domestic ferry routes between Greater Tokyo and Hokkaido, as well as between Kansai and Kyushu.

== History ==
MOL (Mitsui O.S.K. Lines) was launched in 1964, following the merger of Osaka Shosen Kaisha (OSK) (大阪商船株式会社, Ōsaka Shōsen Kabushiki-gaisha) created in 1878, and Mitsui Steamship Co., Ltd. founded in 1942, formerly known as Mitsui Line, under the Law Concerning the Reconstruction and Reorganization of the Shipping Industry. At that time the company was the largest shipping company in Japan, capitalized at ¥13.1 billion, with 83 vessels aggregating 1,237 thousand tonnes deadweight (DWT).

=== 1884–1950 ===
==== OSK ====
OSK was founded in 1884, when 55 ship owners, each of whom had only a small number of vessels, combined their operations. The chief representative of these ship owners was Hirose Saihei, senior manager of the Sumitomo zaibatsu, or conglomerate, and a prominent figure in Osaka financial circles. OSK was capitalized at ¥1.2 million, with 93 vessels totalling 15,400 gross register tons (GRT).

O.S.K. Line's travel brochure "The Inland Sea," c. 1932

In the first few years its routes were limited to coastal services in the western area of Japan. In 1890, OSK inaugurated an Osaka-Pusan run followed in 1893 by the operation of an Osaka-Incheon route and Korean coastal services. The company was recapitalized at ¥1.8 million in 1893, rising to ¥2.5 million in 1894, to ¥5 million in 1896, when the government of Taiwan granted OSK subsidies for Osaka-Taiwan liner services, and to ¥10 million in 1898 when the company started to operate on the Yangtze River.

In 1898, Tokugoro Nakahashi became the company's third president. He made a great effort to rationalize the internal organization of OSK, to penetrate the Chinese market, and also to inaugurate the first OSK ocean route, a Hong Kong to Tacoma, Washington service, in 1908. In 1911 OSK started a Kobe to Bombay service. The route was under the monopoly of the Far Eastern Freight Conference (FEFC) of which Nippon Yusen K.K. (NYK) was the only Japanese member. OSK fought against the FEFC and was admitted to the conference in 1913. In 1918, the company opened a Bombay to Marseille route and was admitted to full membership of the FEFC. Meanwhile, it opened a San Francisco route, an Australia route, and a South America route, offering a worldwide liner service. It began a New York City service in 1920 but operated at a deficit. In 1930 OSK made a huge investment in five new high-speed motor ships in order to start a New York express service. This service entirely transformed raw-silk transportation from Asia to America; raw silk began to be carried by water all the way to New York instead of going by land. OSK's share of cargo shipped on this route grew, and its business performance improved in spite of unfavourable business conditions.

Steamship brochure "Japan and Round the World, O.S.K. Line," c. 1933

During the Great Depression, OSK and NYK made a cooperative agreement in 1931 whereby OSK abolished its Puget Sound route, which had called at Tacoma and Seattle, and in turn acquired a monopoly on the South American east coast route. OSK quickly recovered from the deficits of 1930 and 1931, and resumed paying dividends in 1932.

The company's profits peaked in 1941, when OSK was capitalized at ¥87 million and had 112 vessels aggregating 557,126 GRT.

==== Mitsui Bussan Kaisha ====
The Mitsui Line was originally the shipping department of the trading company Mitsui Bussan Kaisha. Mitsui Bussan was established in 1876 and obtained exclusive rights to export and market the coal extracted at the state-run Miike mine. It chartered boats and transported coal on its own account. In 1878 it bought a steamship, and in 1888 it bought the mines. Mitsui Bussan became an industrial carrier and the shipping section was established in 1898. The section expanded to become the Shipping Department and moved to Kobe in 1904. The company then owned 9 ships aggregating 36,752 DWT, and on the eve of World War I the fleet totalled 15 ships with 74,635 DWT, increasing to 30 ships totalling 127,141 DWT in 1919. The third general manager, Teijiro Kawamura, expanded the business of the department during World War I; in 1914 it began a tramp service carrying the company's own cargo and that of other companies. In 1917 it constructed a shipyard and set up the shipbuilding department and in 1920 it opened a semi-liner service from Dalian via Kobe to Seattle, whereby a liner service operated on outbound voyages but on the return voyage, owing to insufficient cargo at Seattle, ships had to stop and collect cargo at other ports.

Mitsui Bussan's Shipping Department built two sister ships in 1924. One was equipped with reciprocal oil-burners, the other had diesel engines and was the first ocean-going diesel ship in Japan. The department put these ships on the North American route and compared their performance. Akagisan Maru, the diesel ship, proved superior, and Mitsui concluded a manufacturing and marketing license agreement with Burmeister and Wain Co. (B & W), who had manufactured the engine, in 1926. In 1928 Mitsui opened a Bangkok route, in 1931 a Philippines route, in 1932 a Dalien to New York route, and in 1935 a Persian Gulf route. From 1933 the Shipping Department became known as Mitsui Line. In 1937 it owned 35 ships aggregating 227,044 DWT. The shipbuilding department was separated off as the Mitsui Tama Shipyard in 1937, and in 1942 the former Shipping Department too became a separate company, Mitsui Steamship Co., Ltd. (MS). It was capitalized at ¥50 million, and Takaharu Mitsui was elected chairman.

==== World War II ====
During World War II OSK, like other Japanese shipping companies, was forced to be a mere ship owner. When the war ended it had only 55 vessels left, totalling 143,976 GRT, most of which were so-called wartime standard ships, of poor quality. All ships were under control of the Allied powers through the Civilian Merchant Marine Committee. In 1950, however, OSK returned to global service. By the end of 1957 the company had almost recovered the sailing rights it had been given by the FEFC before the war, and was making 18 voyages per month on 13 overseas liner routes. Competition was far more intense than before the war, as anyone who had money could construct ships under the government-sponsored shipbuilding program, started in 1947. Before the war, conference members had sought to exclude newcomers. OSK constructed 38 ships under the program. In 1953 OSK established an eastbound route to South America to transport emigrants from Japan. At first the service was profitable, but the number of emigrants fell to below 2,000 per year in 1962. In 1963 OSK established the Japan Emigration Ship Co., Ltd. (JES) to hive off this loss making business. Later, JES was reorganized into Mitsui OSK Passenger Co., Ltd. In this period most of OSK's businesses were loss making. In 1964 it owned 41 vessels totalling 376,539 GRT. The company was capitalized at ¥7.6 billion and its debts totalled approximately ¥34.9 billion.

=== 1950–1964 ===
During World War II, and after the war, all MS ships were under the control of the government. When Japan lost the war in 1945, only 17 of MS's vessels were left, increasing to 22 vessels totalling 77,459 DWT when MS re-acquired operations that had previously been chartered out to the Civilian Merchant Marine Committee (CMMC).

==== Post-war ====
MS then began a vigorous expansion of its fleet and routes to re-establish its pre-war network, and went so far as to apply to the FEFC. When its application was rejected, MS placed outsider—non-conference-member—ships on this route in 1953. After a long struggle, the conference attempted to resolve the issue politically and the British ambassador openly criticized Japan's shipping policies in 1955. Japan joined the General Agreement on Tariffs and Trade (GATT) the same year, and Japan's minister of transport was anxious to settle the issue without dispute. The final proposal of the conference, through the mediation of the minister of transport, contained extremely harsh conditions which MS had to accept, one of which was that MS could only join the FEFC if it operated under the management of NYK for several years. The 39-month battle was over, and MS began placing ships under the auspice of NYK in 1956. Five years later, MS at last joined the conference.

==== Shipbuilding ====
MS constructed 38 vessels between 1950 and its merger with OSK in 1964, and its operating tonnage was the largest in Japan. One of its ships, Kinkasan Maru, was the first bridge-controlled ship in the world. MS planned to rationalize its crews and at the same time improve the working conditions of engineers. It cooperated with Mitsui Shipbuilding & Engineering Co., a direct successor of Mitsui Tama Shipyard, and designed innovatory bridge-controlled ships. The Kinkasan Maru was delivered in 1961 and MS placed it, along with another bridge-controlled ship, on the New York route, which was re-opened in 1951. Besides the New York route, MS operated westbound and eastbound routes around the world, a Central and South America route, a West Africa route, and a Great Lakes route. In 1964 MS owned 45 vessels aggregating 737,098 DWT. However, MS's performance was disappointing from 1950 until the OSK merger in 1964, when it was capitalized at ¥5.5 billion and had debts of ¥26.7 billion.

== Mitsui-OSK merger ==
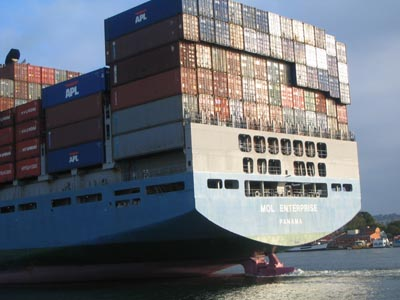
The MOL Enterprise container ship in 2004

Soon after the shipping industry reorganization of 1964, in which Japanese shipping companies were restructured into six groups, world shipping moved toward containerization. Mitsui O.S.K. Lines, Ltd. (MOL), formed by the merger of OSK and MS, began container services on the California route, joining a space-charter consortium of four Japanese operators.

Business results improved after the merger, and the loss brought forward was written off in 1966. The company was recapitalized at ¥20 billion in 1968, and at ¥30 billion in 1972. The owned fleet increased to 152 vessels, totalling 6.6 million DWT in 1974, and the operating fleet—owned vessels and time-chartered vessels—numbered 291 vessels, totalling 10 million DWT.

=== Containerization ===
The first container ship, MOL's America Maru, sailed from Kobe to San Francisco in October 1969. Containerization spread to other routes, including the Australia route, with NYK and Yamashita-Shinnihon Steamship Co., in 1970; the North Pacific route, with five other Japanese companies, in 1971; and the Europe route, as part of the TRIO Group consisting of MOL, Nippon Yusen Kaisha, Overseas Container Line, Ben Line, and Hapag-Lloyd, in 1971. On the New York route and Mediterranean routes a container service began in 1972. In June 2013, one of its container ship, MOL Comfort, broke in two and sank off Yemen. The bow section caught fire before sinking. All 26 crew reported rescued by three other container ships that diverted to her, Hapag-Lloyd's Yantian Express, Hanjin Beijing of now defunct Hanjin Shipping and ZIM's ZIM India. The crews of three ships found them in two raft and one lifeboat.

=== Carrying ore ===
The other trend was toward specialization. Both OSK and MS had ore carriers, and after the merger MOL held the largest share of the Japanese ore market. The Yachiyosan Maru, at 123,800 DWT, built in 1970 under a cargo guarantee from Nippon Steel Corporation, was the largest ore carrier in Japan at that time.

=== Cars ===
MOL built Oppama Maru, the first Car Carrier ship in Japan in 1965, under cargo guarantee from Nissan Motor Company. MOL could not carry cars at a low freight rate because it had to stick to the conference rate. Nissan therefore established the Nissan Motor Car Carrier Co. in 1970 to operate Oppama Maru and transport its cars. Based on this model, MOL and Honda established the Act Maritime Co. in 1973 to carry Honda cars to the United States.

MOL Ro-Ro Car Carrier division is named ACE (Auto Car Carrier Express), and majority of the Roll-on/roll-off vessels in the company fleet have the suffix "Ace" in their names. The division specializes in maritime transport and distribution of brand new and used automobiles, trucks, trailers, Mafi roll trailers, heavy construction machineries and further types of rolling freight.

Since 1990, MOL has invested in the regional feeder line Euro Marine Logistics.

In July 2006, MOL-operated Cougar Ace suffered one of the worst stability accident in the industry. In that occasion, despite all her cargo was a total loss, the ship was salvaged and still sails.

On 1 January 2019, MV Sincerity Ace caught fire when sailing northwest of Oahu, en route from Japan to Honolulu port. Several vessels sailing close by were diverted by the US Coast Guard to rescue her crew, however 4 fatalities and 1 missing person were reported.

On 17 February 2022, Felicity Ace caught fire close to Azores islands, en route from Emden to Davisville in US. The ship was fully loaded with Porsche and Volkswagen cars. After sending a distress signal, the 22 crew members were airlifted, while a Portuguese navy ship and four cargo vessels went to rescue, waiting for salvage tugs to arrive. The ship sank on 2 March while under tow.

=== Oil crisis ===
The U.S. gold embargo in 1971 and the advent of a floating world monetary system was a severe blow for MOL. It changed its financial strategy, keeping more funds in U.S. dollars and in other currencies. More serious was the 1973 oil crisis. MOL immediately cancelled tankers under construction and recorded its best business performance since the merger; freight revenue topped ¥327.5 billion. Soon afterward, however, results deteriorated rapidly and the downslide continued until 1978.

MOL made great efforts to curtail costs, and simultaneously increased the size and number of container ships. Containerization increased on routes between industrially advanced and developing countries, and huge investment was needed to finance this expansion. The development of intermodal transportation on the North America route also began, and MOL introduced a Mini Land Bridge (MLB) service in 1972, using rail transport as well as shipping to reduce transit time, to compete with the U.S. shipping company Sea-Land, extending the service to IPI (Interior Point Intermodal) service in 1980.

Around the time that the MLB service started, the world trade structure began to change and in 1979 about 60% of general cargo from Asia to the United States came to be loaded at newly industrialized countries (NICs). MOL reorganized its routes, changing its starting ports for U.S. voyages from Japan to Hong Kong, Taiwan, and other NICs, while shipping companies in the newly industrialized countries captured this new demand and branched out into the Pacific routes. The competition in sea transportation increased and MOL began a direct container service between the Far East and the west coast of North America in 1982. MOL invested huge capital to consolidate these services and to establish a service network in the United States.

As a countermeasure against rising oil costs MOL built energy-efficient ships, cooperating with Mitsui Engineering & Shipbuilding. Awobasan Maru, delivered in 1981, was the first ship incorporating innovations that reduced fuel consumption by 30%. In 1974 MOL established the Saudi Arabian Shipping Co., Ltd. (SASCO) and Arabian Marine Operation Co. Ltd. (AMOCO) as joint ventures with the prince of Saudi Arabia in Jeddah. SASCO is the shipowner, while AMOCO manages tanker operations. MOL hoped that this joint venture would give it an advantageous status in any future nationalization of oil, but at first the performance of these companies was not good, and AMOCO acquired the rights to bunker supply in 1977. Two years later the second oil crisis occurred and MOL was able to get a stable bunker supply.

=== Scaling back ===
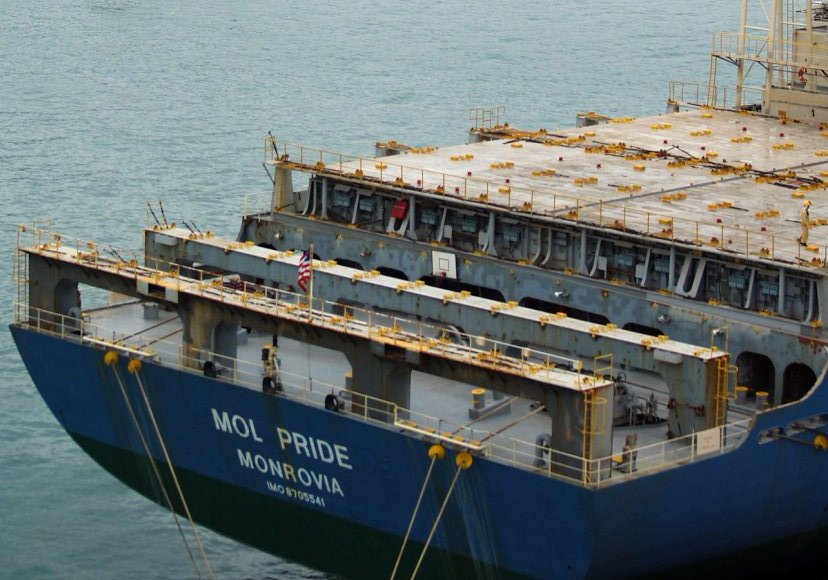
MOL ship with a Liberian flag of convenience

Personnel expenses increased after the first oil crisis, and the yen was revalued. These changes hit MOL heavily as a large part of its income was in U.S. dollars. To make itself more competitive, MOL reduced the number of its own vessels and increased the number of flag of convenience (FOC) ships; its own ships fell in number from 127 in 1975 to 82 in 1982, and the number of employees at sea from 3,127 to 2,233, while freight revenue increased from ¥282 billion to ¥476 billion over the same period. MOL also built highly rationalized ships in cooperation with MES, which would require a crew of only 18, the minimum number accepted by the Seamen's Act, while other ships required 22 or 24. The first super-advanced ship was the Canberra Maru, delivered in 1979, which was put on the Australia route.

=== Passenger service ===
In 1970 MOL established Mitsui OSK Passenger Co., Ltd. (MOP), with the reorganization of JES. MOP has three passenger ships. The company was the only one in Japan to operate an ocean-going passenger service at that time, but later in the 1990s a few Japanese shipping companies entered this market to cope with the boom in travelling by sea.

=== LNG ===
In 1983 the import of liquefied natural gas (LNG) on Free on Board (FOB) conditions began as part of the diversification of Japan's energy resources, and MOL, NYK, Kawasaki Steamship, Chubu Electric Power Company, Incorporated and other Japanese electricity and gas companies jointly established two specialized companies, Badak LNG Transport Inc. and Arun, to transport LNG from Indonesia. These two companies operated seven LNG ships, constructed by MOL and other shipping companies. MOL also took delivery in 1983 of the Kohzan Maru, Japan's first large-sized methanol carrier, and transported methanol from Saudi Arabia to Japan. Japan's exports of industrial plant grew at that time and modularization began. MOL was interested in the transportation of massive plants and took delivery of five specialized ships, including the Atlas Maru, equipped with a 600-ton capacity derrick, one of the largest in the world. Plant exports began to decline in the late 1980s and these special ships were mostly sold or changed their flags.

== Restructuring ==
In 1984 the Maritime Act of the United States was revised and the mandatory independent action clause was introduced. This gave shipping companies the right to introduce a discount tariff if registered at the Federal Maritime Commission. The conferences on North American routes became extremely weak and freight rates on the routes dropped sharply. Every route between the Far East and the United States made losses and MOL's business performance deteriorated again. Once more, MOL worked hard to curtail expenses and establish greater competitiveness on these routes. In the same year it decided to enlarge its container terminal facilities at Los Angeles, and also installed its own container terminals at Asian ports, including Kaohsiung.

MOL also made great efforts to reorganize operations on the Pacific routes, dissolving the consortium of six Japanese companies. In 1985 it began a two-company consortium with Kawasaki Steamship's K Line service (KL) on the Japan/Pacific southwest route, and with East Asiatic Co. (EAC) on the Far East/Pacific southwest route. It also decided to start a three-company consortium with KL and EAC on the Pacific northwest route. On each route it began a weekly service with newly built large container ships. The first such ship, Asian Venture, was an FOC ship at 1,960 20 feet equivalent unit (TEU), indicating the number of containers loaded, and the main ships placed on this route became FOC ships after they were launched in 1984. Moreover, MOL began operating a double stack train service between Los Angeles, Chicago, and Columbus, Ohio in 1985 and extended it to New York in the following year.

The New York route became the most competitive because of this trend toward intermodal forms of transport. NYK, Yamashita-Shinnihon Steamship Co.--later merged with Japan Line to establish Nippon Liner Systems for liner business and Navix Lines for tramp business—and MOL began a joint operation service in 1986 and put on it six high-speed large vessels including MOL's Alligator series ships. To improve services, MOL introduced a computer booking system in 1984 and enlarged its online system to cover the United States and the Far East in 1986. This route, however, became lossmaking after 1986, seriously affecting the company's performance; MOL did not pay dividends between 1987 and 1989.

=== Fleet after restructuring ===
- America Maru

==== Bulk carriers ====
- Aurora Light
- Brasil Maru
- Crystal Pioneer (woodchip carrier)
- Eigen
- Enchanter
- Energia Centaurus
- Grandis
- Envoyager
- Hokuetsu Delight (woodchip carrier)
- KN Arcadia
- Kurenai
- Lambert Maru
- Midnight Dream
- Mona Linden
- Pleiades Dream
- RMC Rigel
- Sea Navigator
- Shiyo
- Vega Dream
- Zebra Wind

==== Car carriers ====
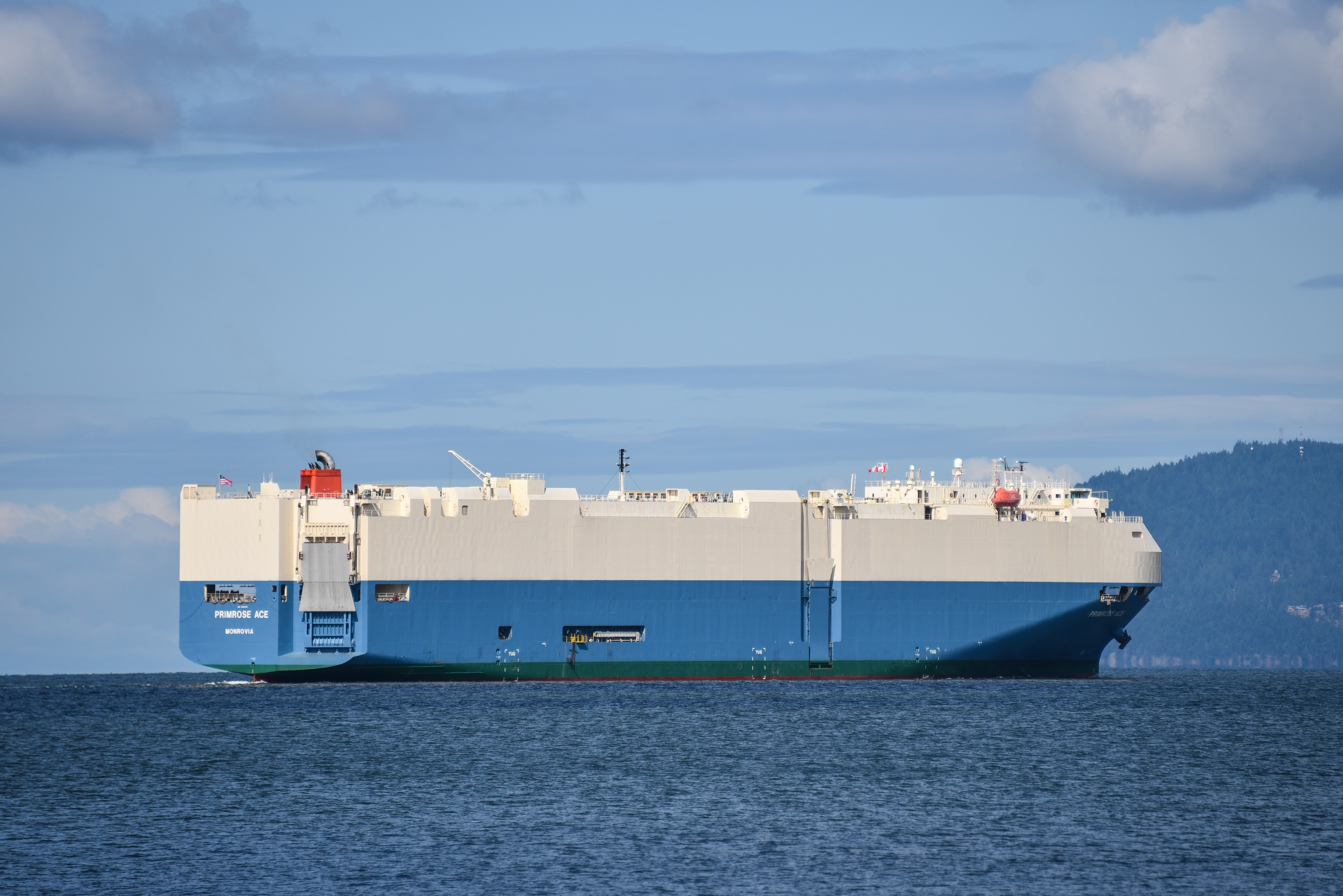
Pure car carrier, Primrose Ace, in English Bay at Vancouver, Canada (2021)

- Adria Ace
- Amethyst Ace
- Aquamarine Ace
- Aquarius Ace
- Azalea Ace
- Bergamot Ace
- Bravery Ace
- Camelia Ace
- Carnation Ace
- Comet Ace
- Cougar Ace (written off - 19 June 2020)
- Courageous Ace
- Crystal Ace
- Divine Ace
- Elegant Ace
- Emerald Ace
- Eminent Ace
- Eternal Ace
- Euphony Ace
- Felicity Ace (written off - March 2022)
- Freedom Ace
- Frontier Ace
- Genuine Ace
- Galaxy Ace
- Gardenia Ace
- Gracious Ace
- Heroic Ace
- Iris Ace
- Istra Ace
- Liberty Ace
- Mercury Ace
- Meridian Ace
- Miraculous Ace
- Neptune Ace
- Onyx Ace
- Opal Ace
- Orca Ace
- Paradise Ace
- Pearl Ace
- Pegasus Ace
- Planet Ace
- Precious Ace
- Prime Ace
- Primrose Ace
- Prominent Ace
- Sanderling Ace
- Salvia Ace
- Sapphire Ace
- Serenity Ace
- Singa Ace
- Sunlight Ace
- Sunrise Ace
- Sunshine Ace
- Swallow Ace
- Swan Ace
- Swift Ace
- Tranquil Ace
- Triumph Ace
- Violet Ace
- Wisteria Ace

==== Cruise ships ====
- MS Mitsui Ocean Fuji
- MS Nippon Maru

==== Ferries and domestic transportation ====
- Blue Diamond
- Sunflower Tomakomai

==== LNG carriers ====
- Abdelkader
- Al Aamriya
- Al Deebel
- Ben Badis
- Dukhan
- Fraiha
- Fukurokuju
- Fuwairit
- GDF Suez Point Fortin
- Grand Mereya
- LNG Aquarius
- LNG Aries
- LNG Capricorn
- LNG Ebisu
- LNG Jurojin
- LNG Pioneer
- LNG Taurus
- LNG Maleo
- Murwab
- Sun Arrows
- Surya Satsuma
- North Light

==== Tankers ====
- Advance Victoria
- Ambassador Norris
- Asian Progress 3
- Asian Progress 4
- Atlantic Explorer
- Atlantic Pioneer
- Azumasan
- Breezy Victoria
- Chokaisan
- Eagle Trader
- Gassan
- Great Tribute - LPG Carrier
- Guanabara
- Hakaisan
- Hakkusan
- Isla de Bioko
- Ivy Express
- Kaimon 2
- Kasagisan
- Kashimasan
- Katsuragisan
- Kirishima
- Las Cuevas
- Libra Trader
- LPG/C Ayame - LPG Carrier
- Maracas Bay
- Mayaro
- Millennium Explorer - Methanol Carrier
- Mitake
- Nariva
- Noble Express
- Noble Spirit - Methanol Carrier
- Opal Express
- Pacific Alliance
- Pacific Partner
- Pacific Voyager
- Pigeon Point
- Omega Trader
- Oriental Jade
- Perseus Trader
- Phoenix Admiral
- Phoenix Advance
- Phoenix Vanguard
- Phoenix Vigor
- Pico Basile
- Ryuohsan
- Saamis Adventurer
- San Fernando
- Shizukisan
- Vemillion Express - Product Tanker
- Yufusan
- Yakumasan

==== Ethane Carriers ====
- Ethane Crystal
- Ethane Emerald
- Ethane Opal
- Ethane Sapphire
- Ethane Topaz
- Ethane Pearl

==== Container ships ====
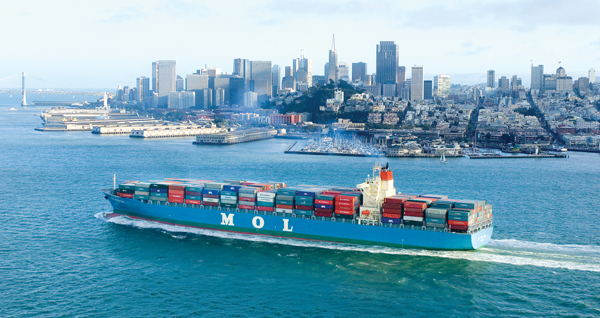
MSC Prestige

- MOL Anchorage
- MOL Advantage
- MOL Bravery
- MOL Celebration
- MOL Comfort (written off - June 2013)
- MOL Competence
- MOL Contribution
- MOL Courage
- MOL Cosmos
- MOL Creation
- MOL Dedication
- MOL Delight
- MOL Dignity
- MOL Diamond
- MOL Earnest
- MOL Efficiency
- MOL Eminence
- MOL Emissary
- MOL Empire
- MOL Endeavor
- MOL Endurance
- MOL Enterprise
- MOL Gateway
- MOL Grace
- MOL Grandeur
- MOL Maestro
- MOL Magnificence
- MOL Maneuver
- MOL Marvel
- MOL Matrix
- MOL Mission
- MOL Modern
- MOL Prestige (intermittently called MSC Prestige when she was under charter to MSC)
- MOL Proficiency
- MOL Triumph
- MOL Trust

=== Internationalization ===
MOL's financial activities became more international after the first oil crisis. The company issued corporate debentures and warrant bonds on the Swiss capital market. Shareholders' equity was ¥57.36 billion, and net income ¥5.94 billion in 1991.

In the same year, the number of directly owned vessels was 54, aggregating 4.15 million DWT, and there were 296 operating vessels, aggregating 13.43 million DWT.

=== New ship orders ===
In 2015 MOL announced its intention to order six new container ships that will be capable of carrying 20,150 20-foot containers. Other shipping groups have announced similar orders for ships of similar size, but when completed these ships will be among the largest container ships in the world. Four ships are to be constructed at Samsung Heavy Industries shipyards in Korea and a further two will be constructed by Imabari Shipbuilding in Japan. The six vessels are set to be launched starting in 2017 and will serve routes between Asia and Europe.

=== 2018 container activities merge ===
On Monday 31 October 2016, Mitsui OSK Lines, Kawasaki Kisen Kaisha, and Nippon Yusen Kabushiki Kaisha agreed to merge their container shipping business via establishing a completely new joint venture company. The integration included their overseas terminal activities. The new joint venture company operating under the name Ocean Network Express from 1 April 2018, with the company headquarters in Japan (Tokyo), a business operation headquarters in Singapore and regional headquarters in United Kingdom (London), United States (Richmond, VA), Hong Kong, and Brazil (Sao Paulo).

=== 2020 oil spill ===
On 25 July 2020, MOL-operated MV Wakashio ran aground and spilled oil at the south of Mauritius.

=== MOL blue bonds ===
On 18 December 2023, Mitsui OSK Lines (MOL) announced its plan to become the first shipping company in Japan to issue "blue bonds" in a public offering, aiming to raise JPY10 billion ($70.3 million) for environmental initiatives over five years. These bonds, which have received the highest rating from the Japan Credit Rating Agency, are part of MOL's "Blue Action 2035" strategy, focusing on marine and global environmental conservation with an investment of $4.5 billion (JPY650 billion) from FY2023 to FY2025.

=== Response to 2022 Russian Invasion of Ukraine ===
Despite the international sanctions imposed on Russia following its invasion of Ukraine in 2022, MOL has maintained its involvement in Russian energy projects. The company has signed long-term charter contracts with Russian operators, including the controversial Sakhalin-2 liquefied natural gas (LNG) project, now under Russian state control. MOL has also faced challenges in delivering tankers for the Arctic LNG 2 project due to tougher sanctions but continues to engage in negotiations to modify contracts. These actions have drawn criticism for indirectly supporting Russia’s economy during its aggression against Ukraine, raising ethical questions about corporate responsibility and compliance with global efforts to isolate Russia economically.

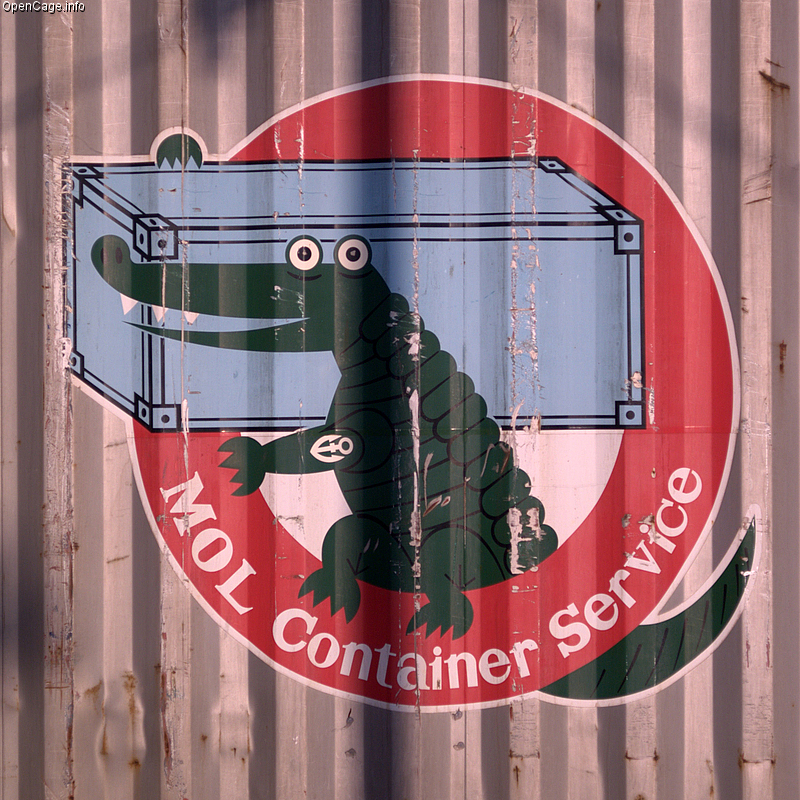
MOL container logo

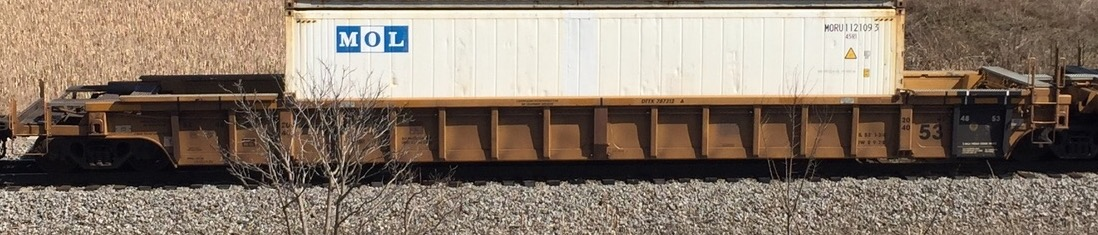
MOL reefer container

=== 2022 Mikage autonomous voyage and docking ===
In August 2022, MV Mikage successfully completed the first crewless sea voyage and docking of an autonomous coastal container ship, sailing 161-nautical miles, from Tsuruga to Sakai, in a two-day trial.

=== 2022 Start of wind-assisted fleet ===
In October 2022, MOL started operation of Shofu Maru, a coal carrier fitted with a 'Wind Challenger' hard sail wind propulsion system. Towards achieving net-zero greenhouse gas (GHG) emissions by 2050, the company plans to invest in a substantial fleet of wind-assisted ships. In its first 18 months of operation, Shofu Maru is estimated to have reduced fuel consumption by 5% to 8% per voyage. In 2024, a further wind assisted vessel was added, Green Winds.

=== 2023 dedication to 2050 net-zero emission and investment in off-shore wind turbines ===
In April 2023 Mitsui OSK Lines has published a 51 page commitment paper detailing their long-term plans on their company's sustainability management. In 11 September 2023 the president has announced an investment Dutch company, TouchWind.

== Subsidiaries ==
The new MOL Tribute on the Elbe with destination Port of Hamburg in September 2017

- International Energy Transport Co., Ltd. (45%)
- International Marine Transport Co., Ltd. (58%)
- Mitsui OSK Passenger Line Co., Ltd. (51%)
- M.O. Seaways, Ltd. (99%)
- International Container Terminal (92%)
- The Shosen Koun (62%)
- Trans Pacific Container Service (90%)
- Japan Express Co., Ltd. (Kobe) (86%)
- Japan Express Co., Ltd. (Yokohama) (81%)
- Blue Highway Line (25.4%)
- Kusakabe Steamship Co., Ltd. (80%)
- Mitsui OSK Kogyo Kaisha, Ltd. (79%)
- Euromol B.V. (100%)
- MOL International S.A. (100%)
- MOL Maritime (India) Pvt. Ltd
- Orange Finance Ltd. (100%)
- Arabian Marine Bunker Sales Co., Ltd. (90%)
- Tokyo Marine Asia Pte Ltd
- TraPac, LLC
- MOL Chemical Tankers Pte. Ltd. (100%)

== Fleet ==
Container ship classes of Mitsui O.S.K. Lines
Ship class	Built	Capacity (TEU)	Ships in class	Notes
MOL Creation-class	2007–2008, 2013–2014	8,110–8,560	10	Operated by Ocean Network Express
MOL Maestro-class	2010–2011	6,724	10	Operated by Ocean Network Express
MOL Globe-class	2011–2012	5,605	10	Operated by Ocean Network Express
MOL Bravo-class	2014–2016	10,100	10	Operated by Ocean Network Express
MOL Triumph-class	2017–2018	20,170–20,182	6	Operated by Ocean Network Express
