= MV Tricolor =

Norwegian vehicle carrier vessel (1987–2002)

Coordinates: 51°22′00″N 2°12′07″E

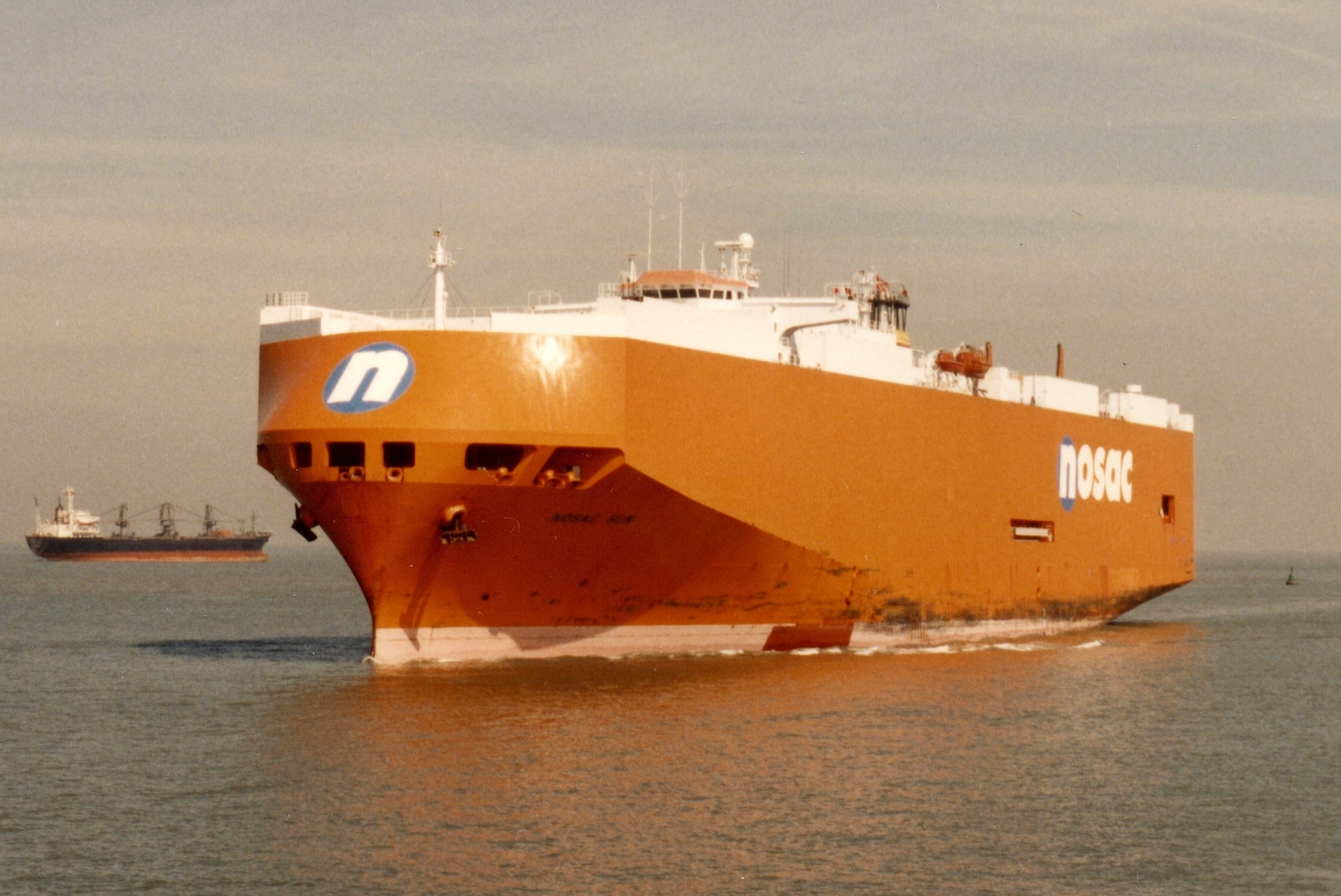
- Nosac Sun in 1994

History

Panama
- Name: Nosac Sun
- Builder: Tsuneishi Shipbuilding Co. Ltd, Japan
- Yard number: 589
- Launched: 3 March 1987
- Completed: 10 June 1987
- Identification: IMO Number 8600181
- Fate: Sold in 1996

Norway
- Name: Tricolor
- Owner: Capital Bank, Scotland
- Acquired: 1996
- Out of service: 14 December 2002
- Fate: Sank following collision

General characteristics
- Class & type: Single screw PCTC (Pure Car Truck Carrier)
- Tonnage: 49,792 GT
- Length: 190 m (620 ft)
- Beam: 32.2 m (106 ft)
- Draught: 9.12 m (29.9 ft)

MV Tricolor was a 50,000 tonne Norwegian-flagged vehicle carrier built in 1987, notable for having been involved in three collisions in the English Channel within two weeks.

== History ==
MV Tricolor was originally launched in 1987 as Nosac Sun. At the time of her collision with Kariba she was operated by Wilh. Wilhelmsen.

== Collision and sinking ==
During the early hours of 14 December 2002, while traveling from Zeebrugge, Belgium to Southampton, UK, with a load of nearly 3,000 automobiles, she collided with Kariba, a 1982 Bahamian-flagged container ship. Kariba was able to continue on, but Tricolor sank where she was struck, some 17 nautical miles (20 mi) north of the French coast within the French exclusive economic zone in the English Channel. While there were no deaths, the ship remained lodged on her side in the mud of the 30 metres (98 ft) deep waterway. A third vessel, MV Clary, was alleged in subsequent litigation to have contributed to the collision by "embarrassment of navigation".

The sinking occurred off Dunkirk harbor, which is France's most northerly seaport and France's third largest port after Marseille and Le Havre.

== Danger to shipping ==
Because of the location of the sunken vessel (Map), at a point where two lanes combine in the Traffic Separation Scheme (TSS) of the English Channel and the Southern part of the North Sea and the fact that she was just completely submerged, the wreck was considered as a hazard to navigation. The TSS at that location is one of the busiest shipping lanes in the world. In December 2002 French authorities ordered the wreck to be removed, as it was perceived to represent a danger to shipping and the environment. Two more collisions happened with MV Tricolor in the days after the sinking.

Emergency Wreck Buoy

Following the sinking and due to its location in a busy point of a shipping lane (the location was on the edge of a turning-point within the TSS of the English Channel), the wreck was initially guarded by the French maritime police patrol boat P671 Glaive and HMS Anglesey (a 195 ft British Island-class patrol vessel), in addition to two salvage vessels and three wreck buoys.

Despite standard radio warnings, three guard ships, and a lighted buoy, the Dutch vessel Nicola struck the wreck the next night and had to be towed free. After this two additional patrol ships and six more buoys were installed, including one with a Racon warning transponder. However, on 1 January 2003 the loaded Turkish-registered fuel carrier Vicky struck the same wreck; she was later freed by the rising tide.

In response to the multiple collisions the International Association of Marine Aids to Navigation and Lighthouse Authorities (IALA) defined a new type of buoy, the Emergency wreck buoy for marking recent wrecks before permanent buoyage and chart updates can occur.

== Salvage ==
The salvage operation of the Tricolor was carried out by a consortium of companies under the name Combinatie Berging Tricolor (Combination for Salvaging Tricolor) that was led by the Dutch company Smit International, and took well over a year. The consortium consisted of Smit Salvage, Scaldis Salvage, URS Salvage & Marine Contracting and Multraship Salvage.

The operation began in July 2003 and was declared complete on 27 October 2004. The salvage method included a carbide-encrusted cutting cable used to slice the wreck into nine sections of 3,000 tonnes each. This technique was similar to one Smit had used in salvaging most of the Russian nuclear submarine K-141 Kursk.

The Dutch company CT Systems, together with Thales Navigation, handled the navigational aspects of the operation. The positioning equipment provided the required locational accuracy and, after using a side scan sonar, the debris was located and all the relevant positional information was converted to a chart, enabling a systematic search and recovery of the remaining debris.

The cargo of 2,871 new cars – mostly from premium German and Swedish manufacturers including BMW, Volvo and Saab – was removed from the wreck and recycled for the metal component. Most oil was removed from the ship's tanks soon after it sank, but during the salvage there was a 540-tonne oil spill.

== See also ==
- Baltic Ace, another car carrier that sank in the North Sea in 2012.
- Cougar Ace, a car carrier with 4,812 vehicles which capsized but did not sink, in 2006.
- Golden Ray, a car carrier which capsized in 2019 and was salvaged (scrapped) in a similar manner in 2021.
- List of roll-on/roll-off vessel accidents
