= MOL Maestro-class container ship =

Container ship class

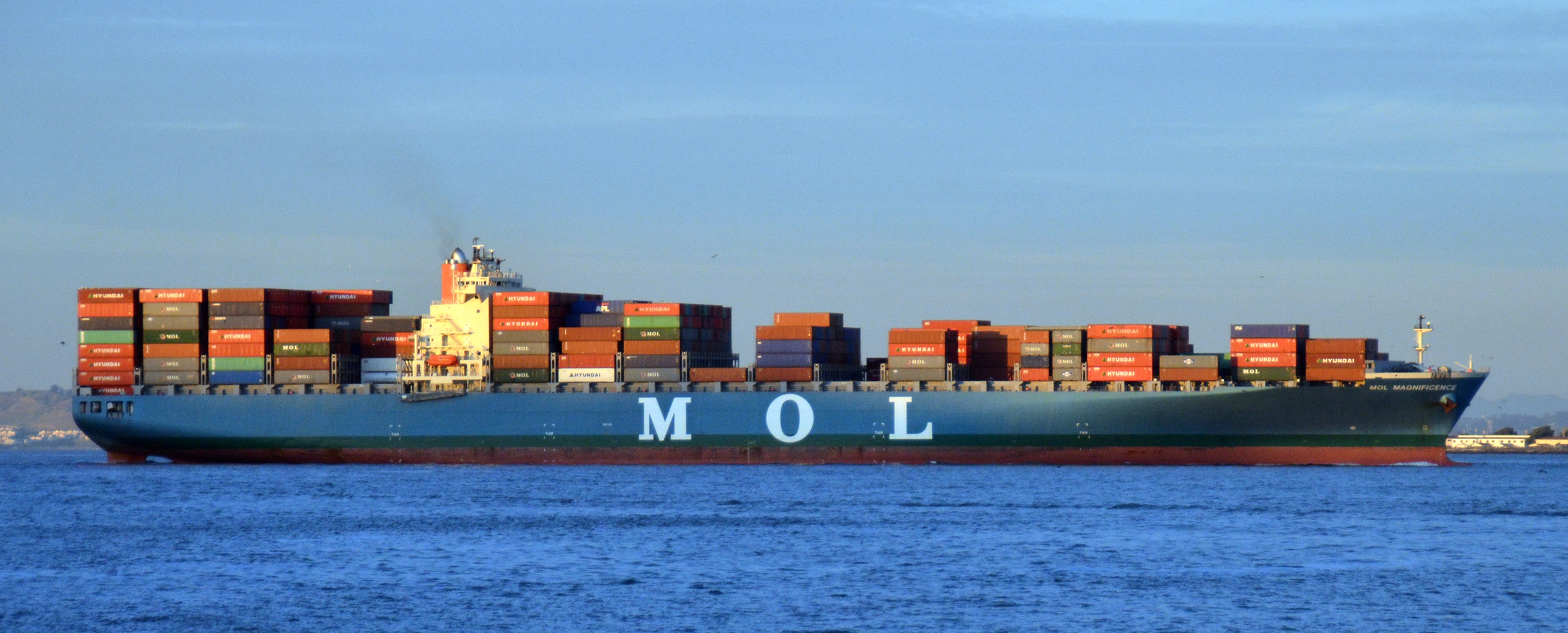

Class overview
- Builders: Mitsubishi Heavy Industries
- Operators: Ocean Network Express
- In service: 2010–present
- Planned: 10
- Completed: 10
- Active: 10

General characteristics
- Type: Container ship
- Tonnage: 78,316 GT
- Length: 302 m (991 ft)
- Beam: 43.4 m (142 ft)
- Draught: 14.2 m (47 ft)
- Capacity: 6,724 TEU

The Maestro class is a series of 10 container ships originally built for Mitsui O.S.K. Lines (MOL) and later operated by Ocean Network Express (ONE). The ships were built by Mitsubishi Heavy Industries at their Kobe and Nagasaki shipyards in Japan. The ships have a maximum theoretical capacity of around 6,724 twenty-foot equivalent units (TEU).

== List of ships ==
Ship	Previous names	Yard number	IMO number	Delivery	Status	ref
Mitsubishi Heavy Industries, Kobe Shipyard
ONE Maestro	MOL Maestro (2010-2024)	1281	9415727	16 Jul 2010	In service	
ONE Magnificence	MOL Magnificence (2010-2020)	1282	9424900	26 Apr 2010	In service	
ONE Majesty	MOL Majesty (2010-2021)	1283	9424912	21 May 2010	In service	
ONE Matrix	MOL Matrix (2010-2020)	1284	9424924	19 Apr 2010	In service	
ONE Maxim	MOL Maxim (2010-2020)	1285	9424936	07 Jun 2010	In service	
ONE Marvel	MOL Marvel (2010-2020)	1286	9475612	03 Sep 2010	In service	
ONE Maneuver	MOL Maneuver (2011-2021)	1287	9475648	9 May 2011	In service	
ONE Mission	MOL Mission (2011-2021)	1288	9475650	10 Mar 2011	In service	
Mitsubishi Heavy Industries, Nagasaki Shipyard
ONE Motivator	MOL Motivator (2011-2021)	2260	9475624	15 Apr 2011	In service	
ONE Modern	MOL Modern (2011-2021)	2261	9475636	23 Feb 2011	In service	

== See also ==
- MOL Triumph-class container ship
- MOL Bravo-class container ship
- MOL Creation-class container ship
- MOL Globe-class container ship
