= MOL Bravo-class container ship =

Container ship class

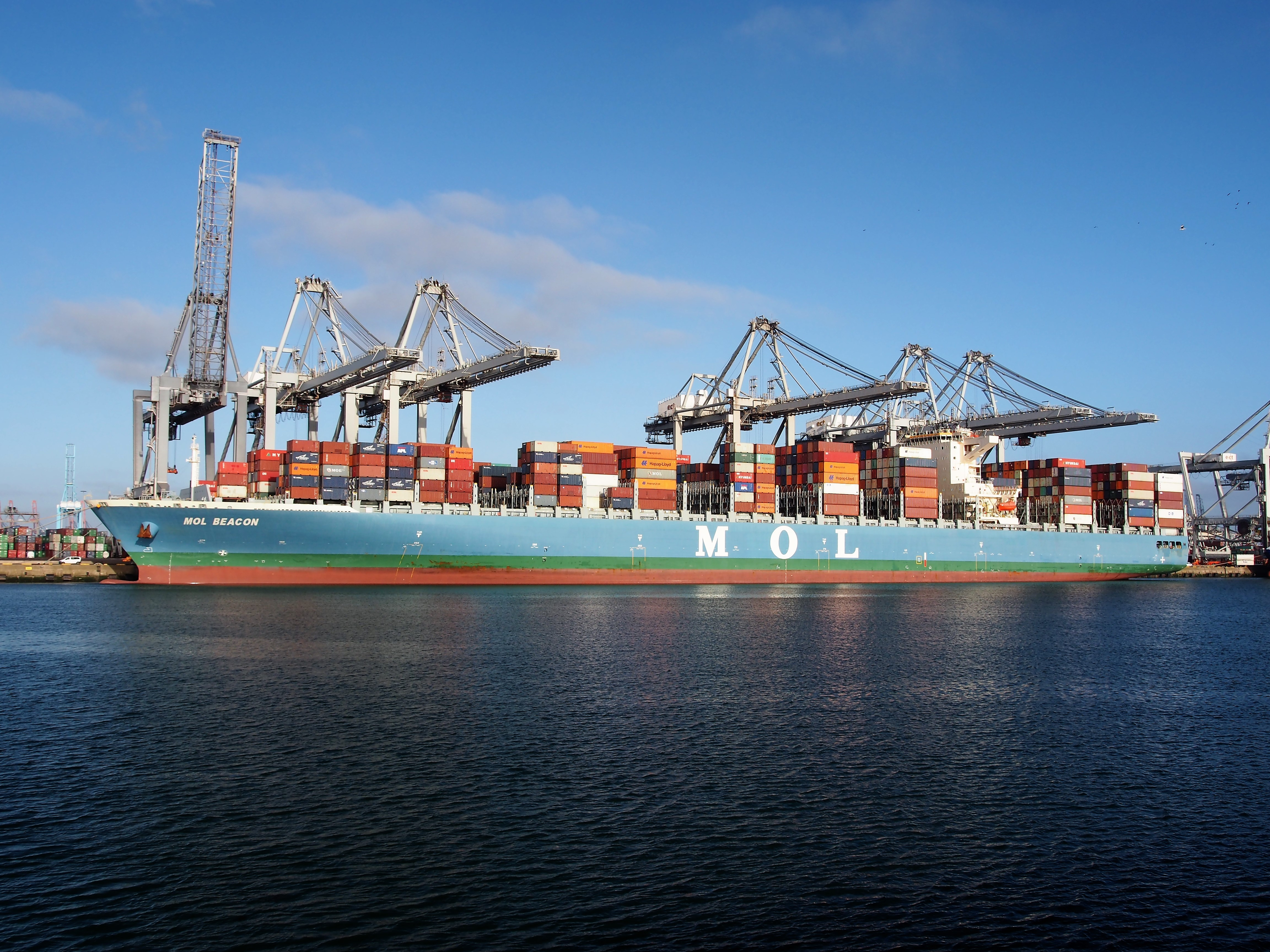
- MOL Beacon in the Port of Rotterdam

Class overview
- Builders: Jiangsu Yangzi Xinfu Shipbuilding
- Operators: Ocean Network Express
- In service: 2014–present
- Planned: 10
- Completed: 10
- Active: 10

General characteristics
- Type: Container ship
- Tonnage: 113,042 GT
- Length: 336.9 m (1,105 ft)
- Beam: 48.2 m (158 ft)
- Draught: 15.2 m (50 ft)
- Capacity: 10,100 TEU

The Bravo class is a series of 10 container ships built for Seaspan Corporation. They were initially chartered to Mitsui O.S.K. Lines (MOL) and later to Ocean Network Express (ONE). The ships were built by Jiangsu Yangzi Xinfu Shipbuilding in China. The ships have a maximum theoretical capacity of around 10,100 twenty-foot equivalent units (TEU).

== List of ships ==
Ship	Previous names	Yard number	IMO number	Delivery	Status	ref
Seaspan Bravo	MOL Bravo (2014–2019)	YZJ2011-1006	9685322	16 Jul 2014	In service	
Seaspan Brilliance	MOL Brilliance (2014–2019)	YZJ2011-1007	9685334	15 Oct 2014	In service	
Seaspan Brightness	MOL Brightness (2014–2019)	YZJ2011-1008	9685346	29 Oct 2014	In service	
Seaspan Breeze	MOL Breeze (2014–2019)	YZJ2011-1010	9685358	12 Nov 2014	In service	
Seaspan Beacon	MOL Beacon (2014–2021)	YZJ2013-1100	9713337	31 Mar 2015	In service	
Seaspan Beauty	MOL Beauty (2015–2020)	YZJ2013-1101	9713349	29 Apr 2015	In service	
Seaspan Belief	MOL Belief (2015–2020)	YZJ2013-1102	9713351	30 Jun 2015	In service	
Seaspan Bellwether	MOL Bellwether (2015–2020)	YZJ2013-1103	9713363	22 Jul 2015	In service	
Seaspan Benefactor	MOL Benefactor (2015–2023)	YZJ2014-1106	9739666	24 Mar 2016	In service	
Seaspan Beyond	MOL Beyond (2016–2021)	YZJ2014-1107	9739678	28 Apr 2016	In service	

== See also ==
- MOL Triumph-class container ship
- MOL Creation-class container ship
- MOL Maestro-class container ship
- MOL Globe-class container ship
