= MOL Comfort =

Container ship

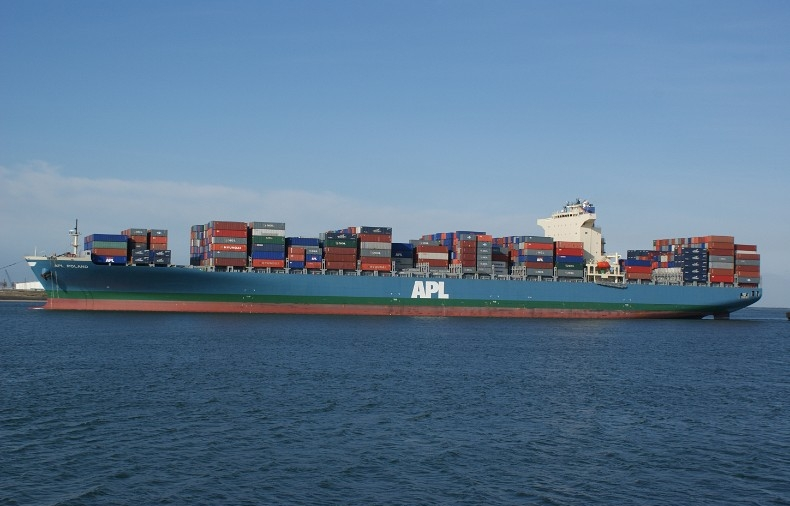
- APL Poland, an identical sister ship of MOL Comfort

History
- Name: MOL Comfort (2012–2013); APL Russia (2008–2012)
- Owner: Ural Container Carriers SA (2011–2013); MOL Euro-Orient Shipping SA (2008–2011)
- Operator: Mitsui O.S.K. Lines (MOL) (2012–2013); American President Lines (APL) (2008–2012)
- Port of registry: Nassau, Bahamas
- Builder: Mitsubishi Heavy Industries, Nagasaki, Japan
- Yard number: 2234
- Laid down: 23 August 2007
- Launched: 8 March 2008
- Completed: 14 July 2008
- In service: 2008–2013
- Identification: Call sign: C6XF2; IMO number: 9358761; MMSI number: 311006900
- Fate: Broke in two on 17 June 2013. Stern section sank on 27 June and bow section on 11 July.

General characteristics
- Class & type: MOL C-class container ship
- Tonnage: 86,692 GT; 48,825 NT; 90,613 DWT
- Length: 316 m (1,036 ft 9 in)
- Beam: 45.6 m (149 ft 7 in)
- Draught: 14.5 m (47 ft 7 in)
- Depth: 25 m (82 ft 0 in)
- Installed power: Mitsubishi-Sulzer 11RT-flex96C, 62,920 kW (84,380 hp)
- Propulsion: Single shaft; fixed-pitch propeller
- Speed: 25.25 knots (46.76 km/h; 29.06 mph)
- Capacity: 8,110 TEU
- Crew: 26

MOL Comfort was a 2008-built Bahamian-flagged post-Panamax container ship chartered by Mitsui O.S.K. Lines. The vessel was launched in 2008 as APL Russia and sailed under that name until 2012, when the ship was renamed to MOL Comfort. On 17 June 2013, she broke in two about 200 nautical miles (370 km; 230 mi) off the coast of Yemen. The aft section sank on 27 June and the bow section, after being destroyed by fire, on 11 July.

== General characteristics ==
With an overall length of 316 metres (1,036 ft 9 in) long, moulded beam of 45.6 metres (149 ft 7 in) and fully laden draught of 14.5 metres (47 ft 7 in), MOL Comfort was too large to transit the Panama Canal and was thus referred to as a post-Panamax container ship. She measured 86,692 in gross tonnage and 48,825 in net tonnage, and had a deadweight tonnage of 90,613 tonnes. The container capacity of the ship, measured in twenty-foot equivalent units (TEU), was 8,110 of which 4,616 TEU is stored on the deck and 3,494 TEU in the holds.

Like most large container ships, MOL Comfort was propelled by a single low-speed two-stroke crosshead diesel engine coupled to a fixed-pitch propeller. Her main engine, a 11-cylinder license-manufactured Mitsubishi-Sulzer 11RT-flex96C, was rated at 62,920 kW (84,380 hp) at 102 rpm and was capable of propelling the ship at 25.25 knots (46.76 km/h; 29.06 mph). She also had six auxiliary diesel generators with a combined output of 14,625 kVA.

The hatch side coamings in modern container ships are subjected to the highest stress of all structural members in the ship. This is due to the large openings in the strength deck needed for loading and unloading containers in the cargo holds. Plate thicknesses up to 90 millimetres (3.5 in) are used to keep the stress levels acceptable. MOL Comfort's sister ship, 2007-built MOL Creation, was the first container ship classified by Nippon Kaiji Kyokai to use ultra-high-strength steel with a yield strength of 470 MPa in these structures to reduce the steel weight by avoiding extreme plate thicknesses.

== Career ==
One of twelve ships of similar design, MOL Comfort was laid down at Mitsubishi Heavy Industries Nagasaki shipyard in Japan on 23 August 2007 and launched on 8 March 2008 as APL Russia for charter to APL (formerly American President Lines). She was completed on 14 July 2008. On 1 June 2012, APL Russia was transferred to Mitsui O.S.K. Lines' Europe-Asia route and renamed MOL Comfort.

=== Shipwreck ===
On 17 June 2013, MOL Comfort suffered a crack amidships in bad weather about 200 nautical miles (370 km; 230 mi) off the coast of Yemen and eventually broke into two after hogging. The vessel was underway from Singapore to Jeddah, Saudi Arabia, with a cargo of 4,382 containers equivalent to 7,041 TEU. The crew of 26—14 Filipinos, one Ukrainian, and 11 Russians—abandoned the ship and were rescued from two liferafts and a lifeboat by three other container vessels, German-flagged container ship Yantian Express of Hapag-Lloyd, Panamaian-flagged Hanjin Beijing of now-defunct Hanjin Shipping and ZIM's ZIM India, sailed under British flag. These vessels were diverted to the site of incident by ICG Mumbai. After the structural failure, both sections remained afloat with the majority of the cargo intact and began drifting in an east-northeast direction. Smit Salvage Singapore was contracted to tow the sections to safety.

On 24 June, four oceangoing tugboats arrived at the scene and began towing the bow section to safety. Before salvage operations of the stern section could begin, water ingress was reported on 26 June. On the following day, the stern sank at 14°26′N 66°26′E to a depth of 4,000 metres (13,000 ft). Some of the approximately 1,700 containers on board were later confirmed floating near the site. While no major oil leak was reported, the stern section was said to contain about 1,500 tons of fuel.

On 2 July, the tow of the bow section broke free in bad weather, but the towing line was reattached the next day. On 6 July, a fire broke out in the rear of the bow section. Unable to control the blaze in bad weather, the salvage vessels requested help from the Indian Coast Guard patrol boat Samudra Prahari with external firefighting equipment. By 10 July, most of the 2,400 containers on board had been destroyed by fire. The damaged bow section sank the next night at 19°56′N 65°25′E to a depth of 3,000 metres (9,800 ft) with what remained of the cargo and 1,600 metric tons of fuel oil in the tanks. No spill apart from a thin oil film on the surface was reported. The cause of the fire is unknown.

The exact cause of the accident is not known. On 4 July, Mitsui O.S.K. Lines appointed Lloyd's Register to support investigations into the cause of the incident. As a precaution, the sister ships of MOL Comfort were withdrawn from the same route and their hull structures will be upgraded to increase the longitudinal strength. In addition, operational changes will be implemented to reduce stress on the vessels' hulls.

The sinking of MOL Comfort cost insurers between 300 and 400 million dollars in claims. The hull and machinery of the vessel were insured for $66 million. By December 2014, the insurers (Tokio Marine & Nichido Fire Insurance Co.) were among 100 companies, including Mitsui O.S.K. Lines Ltd., who had launched lawsuits against MHI, reportedly on the grounds that the accident and consequent loss of ship and cargo was caused by a design flaw in the freighter.

As of 2017, the loss of all 4,293 containers on board is the largest number of containers lost in a single event.
