= Triumph-class container ship =

- MOL Tribute on the Elbe with destination port of Hamburg

Class overview
- Builders: Samsung Heavy Industries; Imabari Shipbuilding
- Operators: Ocean Network Express
- In service: 2017-present

General characteristics (SHI)
- Type: Container ship
- Tonnage: 210,678 GT
- Length: 400 m (1,312 ft)
- Beam: 58.8 m (193 ft)
- Draught: 16 m (52 ft)
- Propulsion: MAN B&W G95ME
- Capacity: 20,170 TEU

General characteristics (Imabari)
- Type: Container ship
- Tonnage: 210,691 GT
- Length: 399.96 m (1,312 ft)
- Beam: 58.5 m (192 ft)
- Draught: 16 m (52 ft)
- Propulsion: MAN B&W G95ME
- Capacity: 20,182 TEU

The Triumph class is a series of six container ships operated by the Japanese shipping company Ocean Network Express (ONE). The ships have a maximum theoretical capacity of 20,182 TEU.

The ships were ordered by Mitsui O.S.K. Lines (MOL) in 2015. Four ships were built by Samsung Heavy Industries in South Korea. The remaining two were built by Imabari Shipbuilding in Japan and are chartered from Shoei Kisen Kaisha.

ONE Tradition (ex MOL Tradition) in Rotterdam

== List of ships ==
| Ship | Previous names | Yard number | IMO number | Delivery | Status | ref |
Samsung Heavy Industries (20170 TEU)
| ONE Triumph | MOL Triumph (2017-2022) | 2167 | 9769271 | 27 Mar 2017 | In service | |
| ONE Trust | MOL Trust (2017-2022) | 2168 | 9769283 | 1 Jun 2017 | In service | |
| ONE Tribute | MOL Tribute (2017-2022) | 2169 | 9769295 | 10 Jul 2017 | In service | |
| ONE Tradition | MOL Tradition (2017-2022) | 2170 | 9769300 | 31 Aug 2017 | In service | |
Imabari Shipbuilding Saijo shipyard (20182 TEU)
| ONE Truth | MOL Truth (2017-2023) | 8180 | 9773210 | 31 Oct 2017 | In service | |
Imabari Shipbuilding Marugame shipyard (20182 TEU)
| ONE Treasure | MOL Treasure (2018-2023) | 1800 | 9773222 | 31 Jan 2018 | In service | |

== See also ==
- MOL Bravo-class container ship
- MOL Creation-class container ship
- MOL Maestro-class container ship
- MOL Globe-class container ship
