= Heroic Ace =

Car and truck carrier ship owned by Mitsui O.S.K. Lines

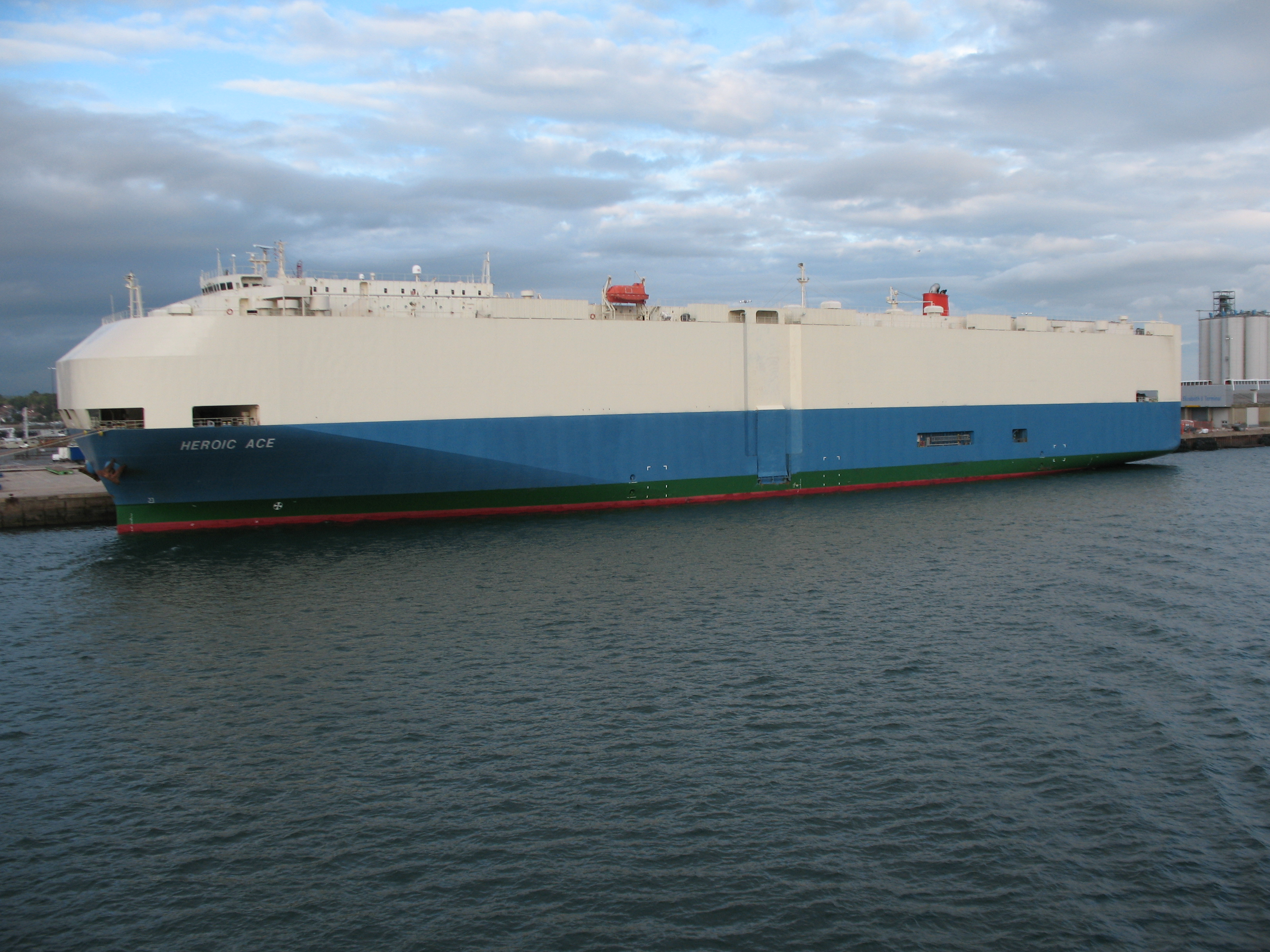
- Heroic Ace, Southampton, England, 11 August 2011

History
- Name: Heroic Ace
- Owner: M.O.L (Mitsui O.S.K. Lines)
- Operator: Wilhelmsen ship management
- Port of registry: Panama
- Builder: Minaminippon shipyard, Seto Inland Sea, Japan
- Launched: 18 March 2003
- Identification: IMO number: 9252216; Call sign: HPFM
- Status: In Service

General characteristics
- Tonnage: 56,439 gross tonnage (GT)
- Length: 198 m (650 ft)
- Beam: 32.2 m (106 ft)
- Speed: 21.1 knots (39.1 km/h; 24.3 mph)

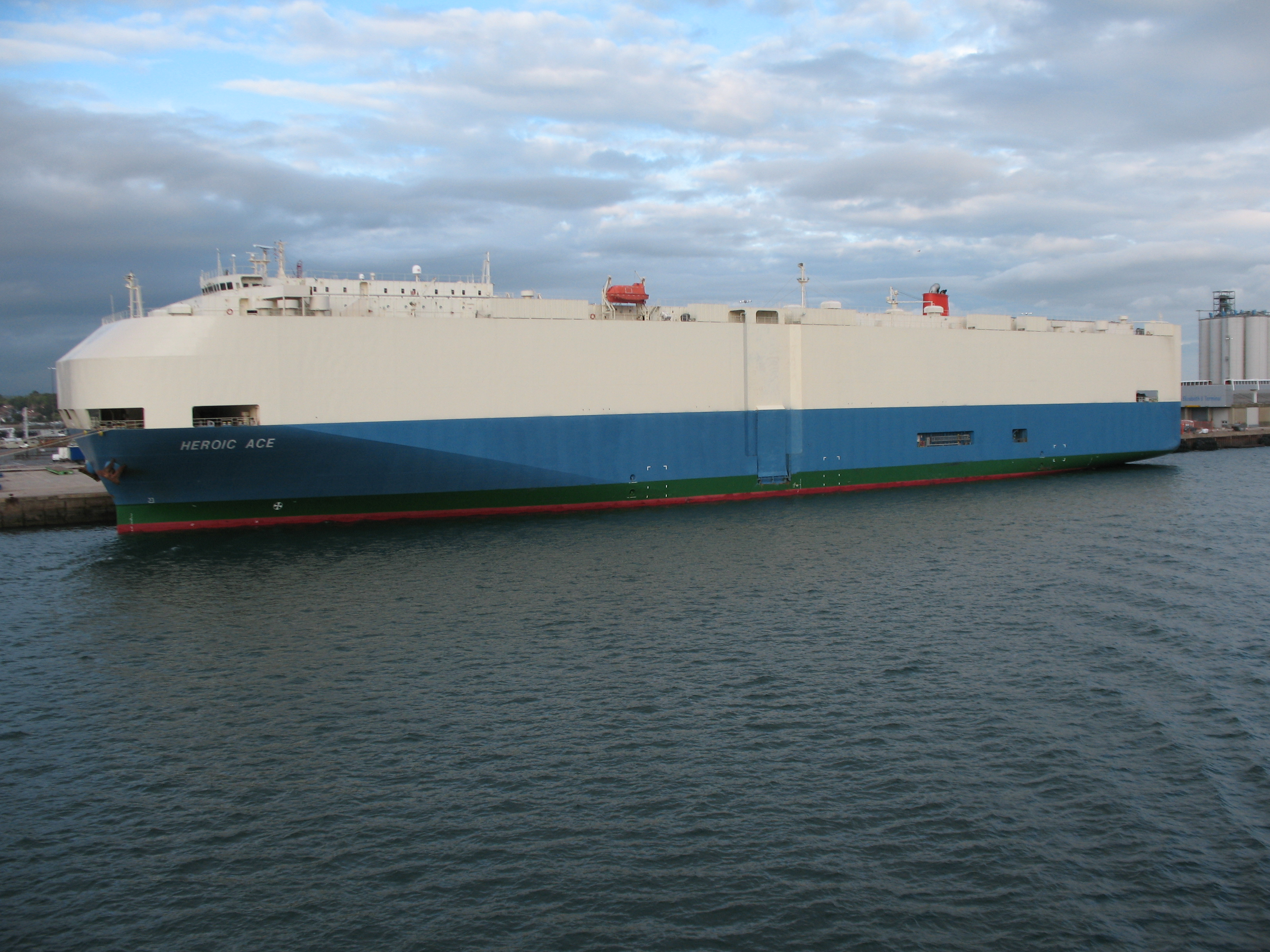

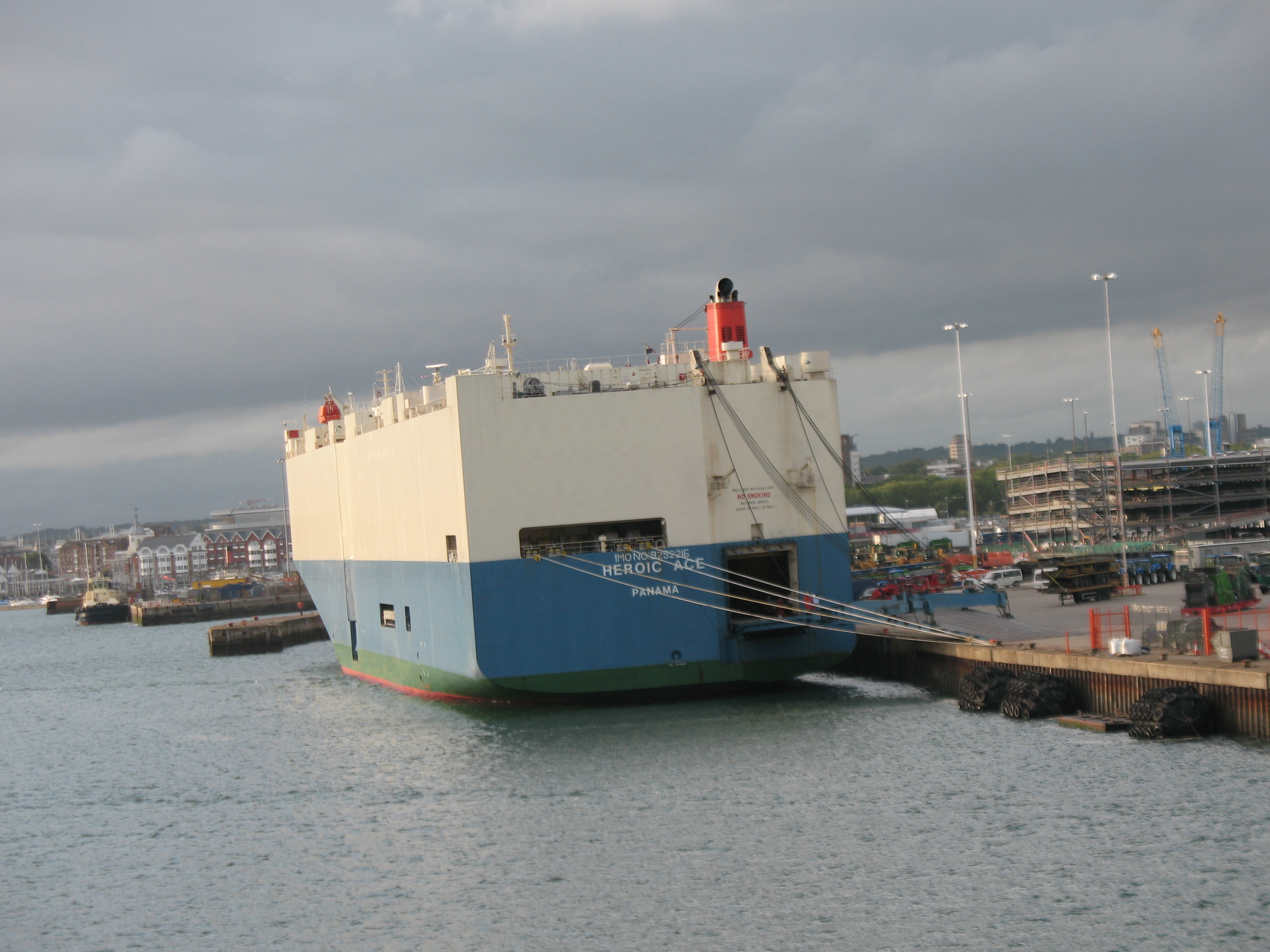
Heroic Ace docked at Southampton, England, 11 August 2011

M.V. Heroic Ace is a PCTC (Pure car and truck carrier) owned by M.O.L (Mitsui O.S.K. Lines), one of the three largest car carrier companies in the world. With a capacity of 6,400 RT 43 cars, it belongs to a class of car carriers that include the largest car carriers in the world.

She was built in 2003 at the Minami Nippon shipyard in the Inland Sea, Japan, as part of a series of 12 large car carriers. Her sister ships include Courageous Ace and Splendid Ace (built at Minami Nippon), Martorell, Progress Ace and Prominent Ace (built at Shin Kurushima yard), and Liberty Ace, Utopia Ace, Paradise Ace and Freedom Ace (built at M.H.I Kobe).

The vessel's bows and superstructure were specially designed with additional rounding off to enable them to navigate at higher speeds.
