= MOL Enterprise =

Container ship

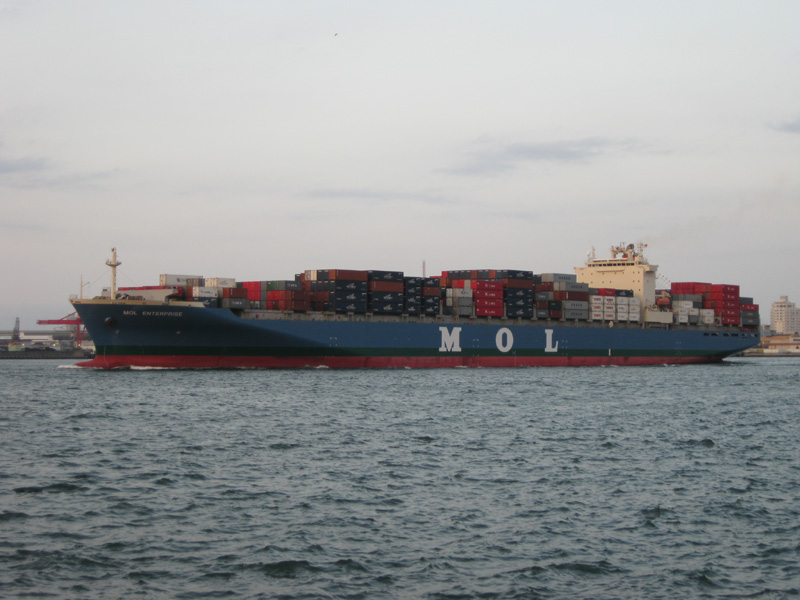
- MOL Enterprise at Osaka, February 2009

History

Panama
- Name: MOL Enterprise
- Namesake: USS Enterprise CVN-65
- Owner: Mitsui O.S.K. Lines
- Operator: New Asian Shipping Co. Ltd., Hong Kong
- Port of registry: Panama
- Builder: IHI Marine United Ltd., Yokohama, Japan
- Launched: 19 September 2003
- In service: 2003-2009
- Renamed: MOL Enterprise (2003-2015), AL Enterprise (2015-2017) & Viktoria (2017)
- Identification: IMO number: 9261748; Call sign: HPTF; MMSI number: 355424000
- Fate: Scrapped 2017

General characteristics
- Type: Container ship
- Tonnage: 53,096 GT; 61,441 DWT
- Length: 293 m (961 ft 3 in)
- Beam: 32 m (105 ft 0 in)
- Draught: 11.5 m (37 ft 9 in)
- Propulsion: 1 × 9-cylinder Wärtsilä-Sulzer RTA96-C diesel engine
- Capacity: 4,646 TEU

MOL Enterprise was a Panamax-type container ship owned by Mitsui O.S.K. Lines, a Japanese transport company that covers major worldwide services and destinations.

The ship was launched on 19 September 2003 and delivered to Mitsui on December 27, 2003, from the IHI Marine United Inc. shipyard at Yokohama. In 2015 she was renamed AL Enterprise and in 2017 Viktoria. She arrived at Chittagong on 7 March 2017 for scrapping.
