= MOL Creation-class container ship =

Container ship class

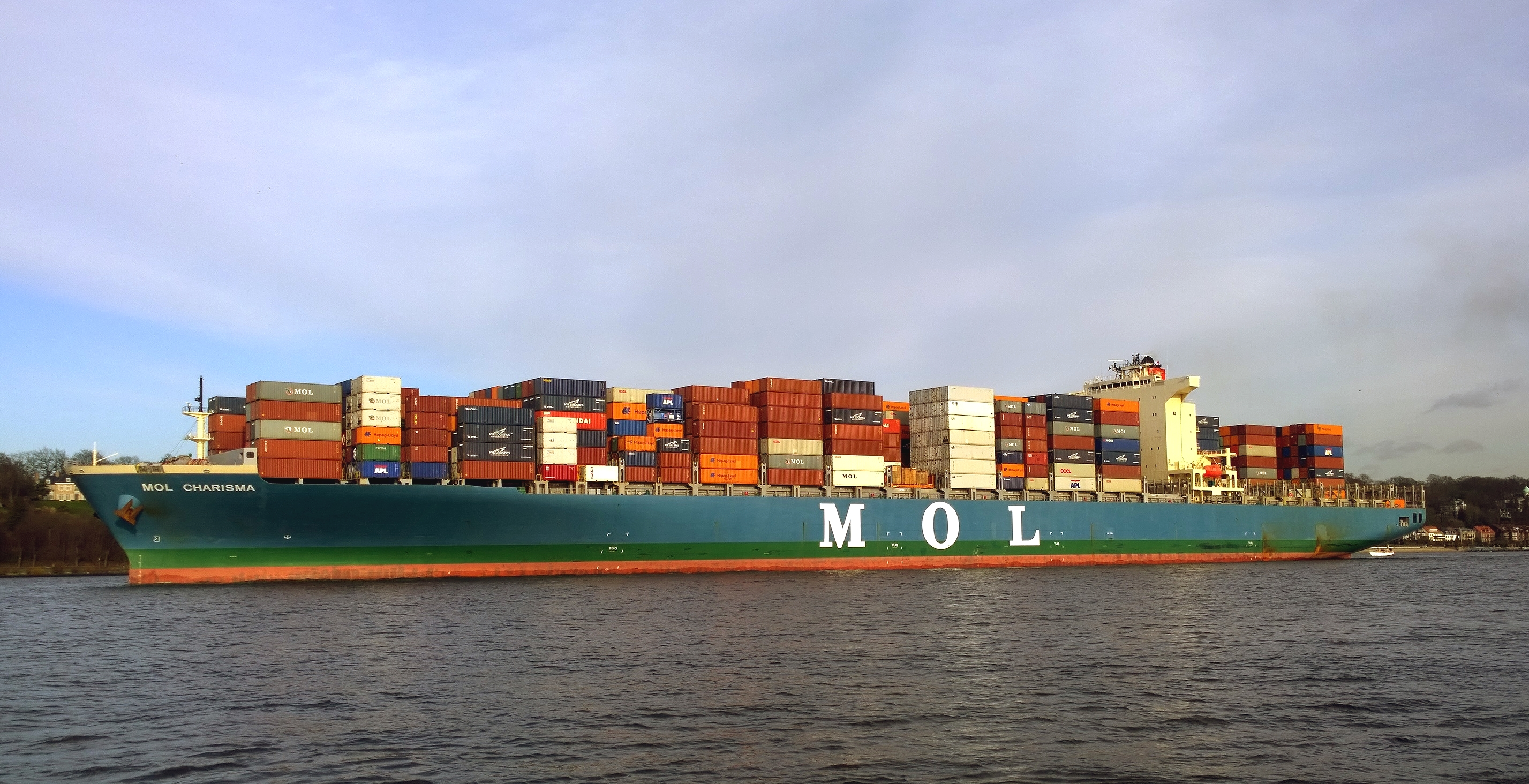
- MOL Charisma on the Elbe

Class overview
- Builders: Mitsubishi Heavy Industries Nagasaki Shipyard; Koyo Dockyard
- Operators: Ocean Network Express
- In service: 2007–present
- Planned: 10
- Completed: 10
- Active: 9
- Lost: 1

General characteristics (MHI)
- Type: Container ship
- Tonnage: 87,000 GT
- Length: 316 m (1,037 ft)
- Beam: 45.6 m (150 ft)
- Draught: 14.5 m (48 ft)
- Capacity: 8,110–8,560 TEU

General characteristics (Koyo Dockyard)
- Type: Container ship
- Tonnage: 88,000 GT
- Length: 320.4 m (1,051 ft)
- Beam: 46 m (151 ft)
- Draught: 14.5 m (48 ft)
- Capacity: 8,110 TEU

The Creation class is a series of similar sized container ships built for Mitsui O.S.K. Lines (MOL) and now operated by Ocean Network Express (ONE). The ships were built by Mitsubishi Heavy Industries Nagasaki Shipyard and Koyo Dockyard in Japan and have a maximum theoretical capacity of around 8,110 to 8,560 twenty-foot equivalent units (TEU).

== List of ships ==
Ship	Previous names	Yard number	IMO number	Delivery	Status	ref
Mitsubishi Heavy Industries Nagasaki Shipyard (8110 TEU)
MOL Creation		2225	9321237	29 Jun 2007	In service	
MOL Charisma	APL France (2007-2010)	2226	9321249	28 Sep 2007	In service	
MOL Celebration		2227	9321251	15 Feb 2008	In service	
MOL Courage	APL Poland (2008-2012)	2228	9321263	31 Mar 2008	In service	
ONE Competence	MOL Competence (2002-2018)	2233	9339662	27 Jun 2008	In service	
MOL Comfort	APL Russia (2008-2012)	2234	9358761	14 Jul 2008	Broke in two and sank	
Koyo Dockyard (8110 TEU)
ONE Cosmos	MOL Cosmos (2008-2018)	2261	9388340	20 Jul 2008	In service	
ONE Continuity	APL Finland (2008-2012); MOL Continuity (2012-2018)	2262	9388352	17 Aug 2008	In service	
Mitsubishi Heavy Industries Nagasaki Shipyard (8560 TEU)
ONE Commitment	MOL Commitment (2013-2018)	2293	9629902	17 Jun 2013	In service	
ONE Contribution	MOL Contribution (2014-2019)	2294	9629914	28 Mar 2014	In service	

== See also ==
- MOL Triumph-class container ship
- MOL Bravo-class container ship
- MOL Maestro-class container ship
- MOL Globe-class container ship
