= MOL Globe-class container ship =

Container ship class

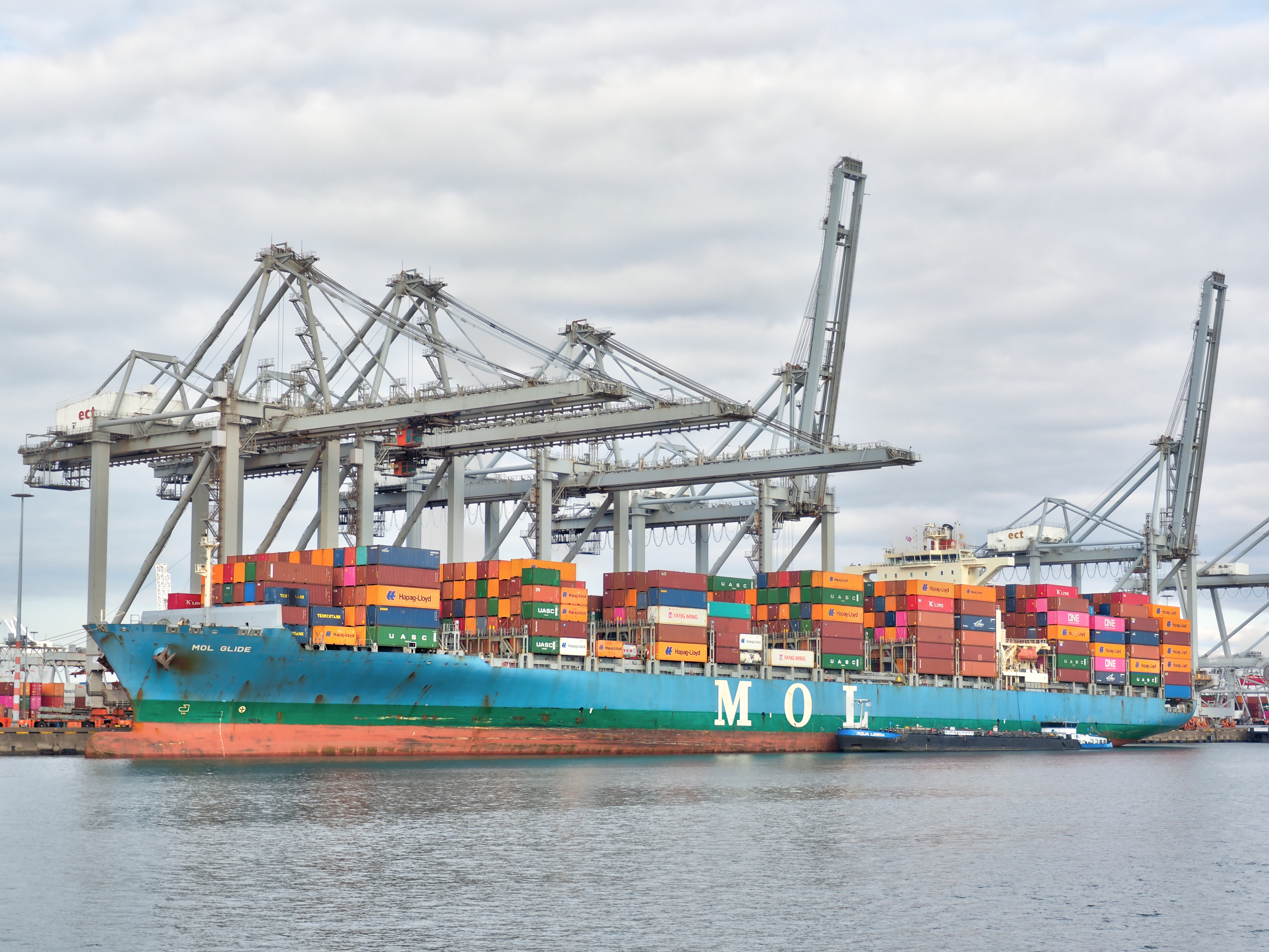
- MOL Glide in the Port of Rotterdam

Class overview
- Builders: Hyundai Samho Heavy Industries
- Operators: Ocean Network Express
- In service: 2011–present
- Planned: 10
- Completed: 10
- Active: 10

General characteristics
- Type: Container ship
- Tonnage: 59,307 GT
- Length: 275 m (902 ft)
- Beam: 40 m (131 ft)
- Draught: 14 m (46 ft)
- Capacity: 5,605 TEU

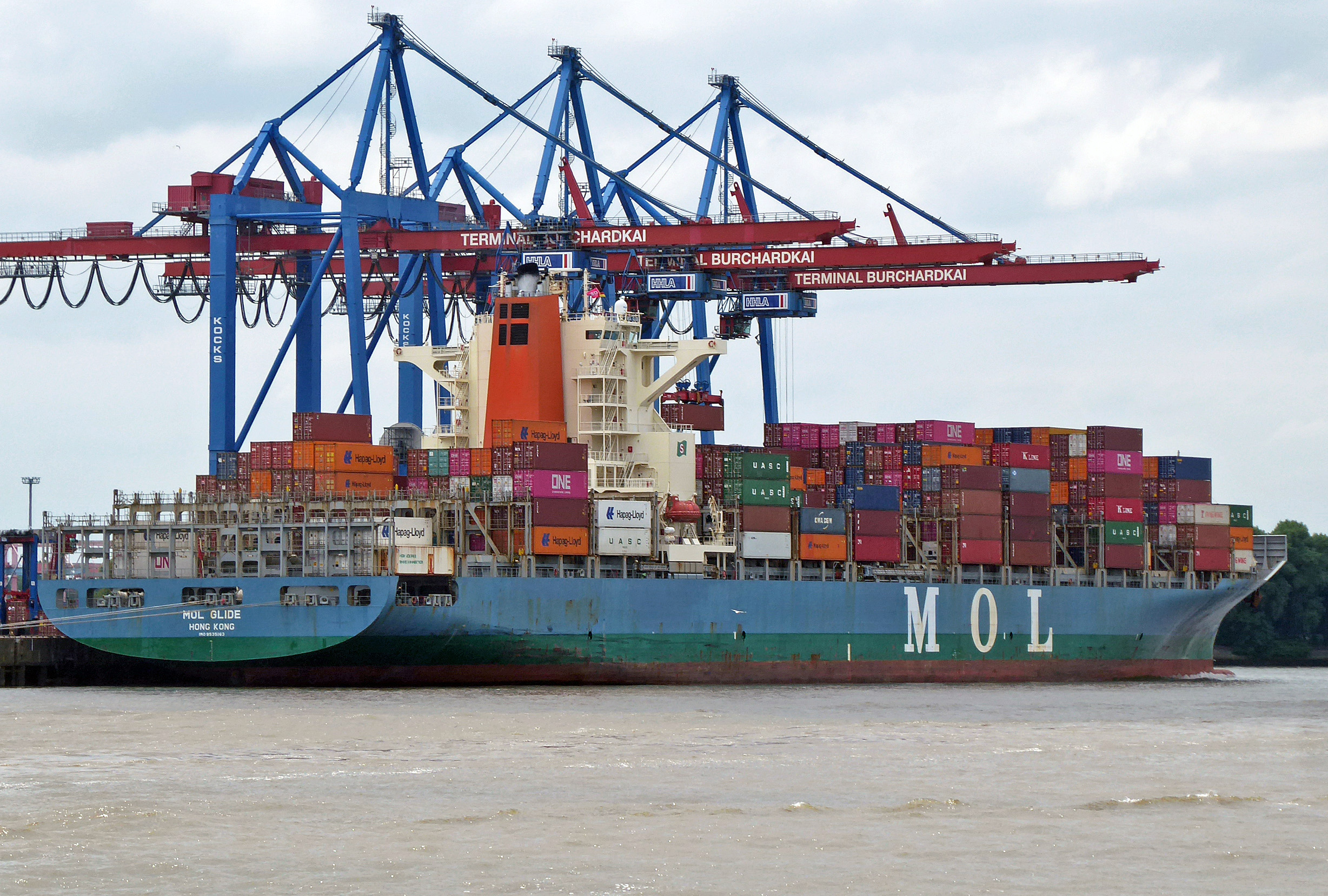
Stern view of MOL Glide 2021

The Globe class is a series of 10 container ships originally built for Bernhard Schulte and operated by Mitsui O.S.K. Lines (MOL) and later operated by Ocean Network Express (ONE). The ships were built by Hyundai Samho Heavy Industries in South Korea. The ships have a maximum theoretical capacity of around 5,605 twenty-foot equivalent units (TEU).

== List of ships ==
Ship	Previous names	Yard number	IMO number	Delivery	Status	ref
Hans Schulte	MOL Globe (2011-2021)	S505	9531909	1 Apr 2011	In service	
ESL Port Klang	MOL Gateway (2011-2021)	S506	9535137	23 May 2011	In service	
Hedwig Schulte	MOL Grandeur (2011-2021)	S507	9535149	14 Jun 2011	In service	
Herta	MOL Garland (2011-2021)	S508	9535151	27 Jun 2011	In service	
Henrika Schulte	MOL Glide (2011-2021)	S509	9535163	22 Sep 2011	In service	
ESL Kabir	MOL Guardian (2011-2021)	S510	9535175	14 Nov 2011	In service	
Hermann Schulte	MOL Gratitude (2012-2022)	S511	9535187	19 Jan 2012	In service	
ESL Nhava Sheva	MOL Genesis (2012-2022)	S512	9535199	7 May 2012	In service	
Hubert Schulte	MOL Growth (2012-2022)	S513	9535204	18 Jun 2012	In service	
ESL Dachan Bay	MOL Generosity (2012-2022)	S514	9535216	25 Jun 2012	In service	

== See also ==
- MOL Triumph-class container ship
- MOL Bravo-class container ship
- MOL Creation-class container ship
- MOL Maestro-class container ship
