= Smit International =

Dutch maritime company

Smit Internationale N.V.
- Type: Subsidiary
- Industry: Maritime services
- Founded: 1842
- Founder: Fop Smit
- Headquarters: Rotterdam, Netherlands
- Key people: Frank Verhoeven (Chairman)
- Services: Towage, salvage, transportation, heavy lifting vessels
- Revenue: €589.0 million (2009)
- Operating income: €104.6 million (2009)
- Net income: €102.4 million (2009)
- Owner: Boskalis
- Number of employees: 3,620 (2009)
- Website: www.smit.com

The first house flag

The second house flag, used in the 1960s.

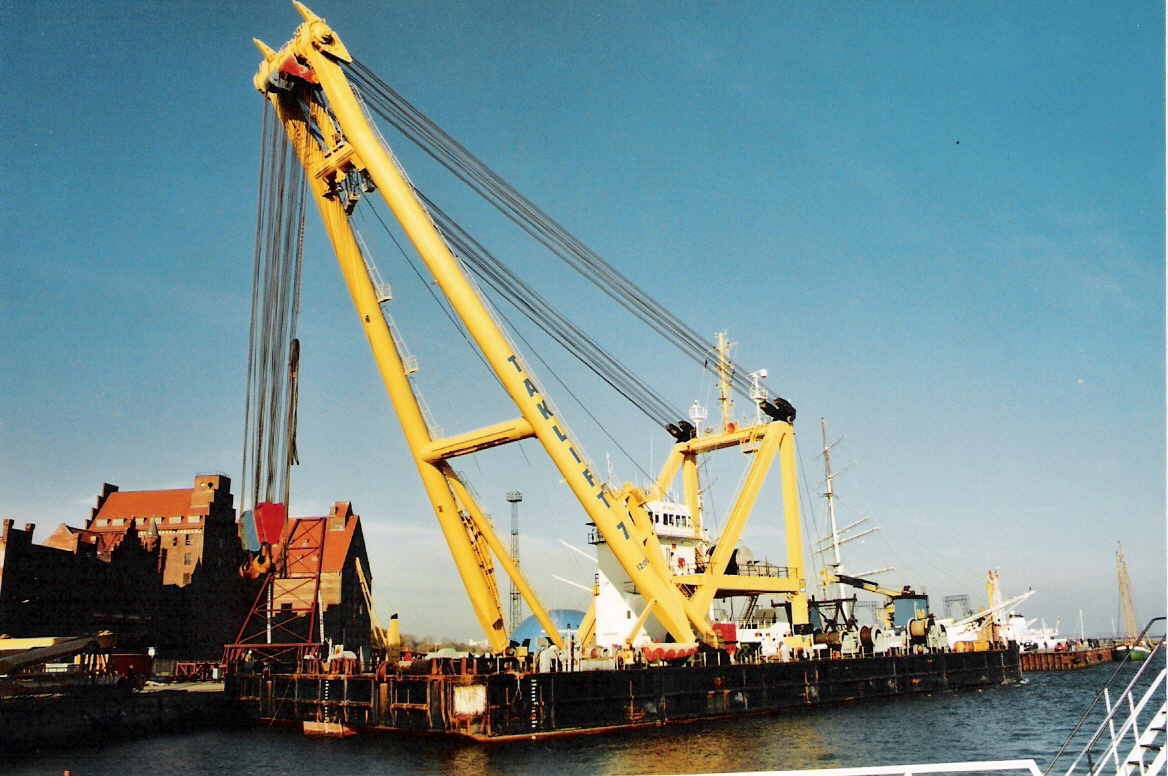
Taklift 7 has a lifting capacity of 1,600 tons

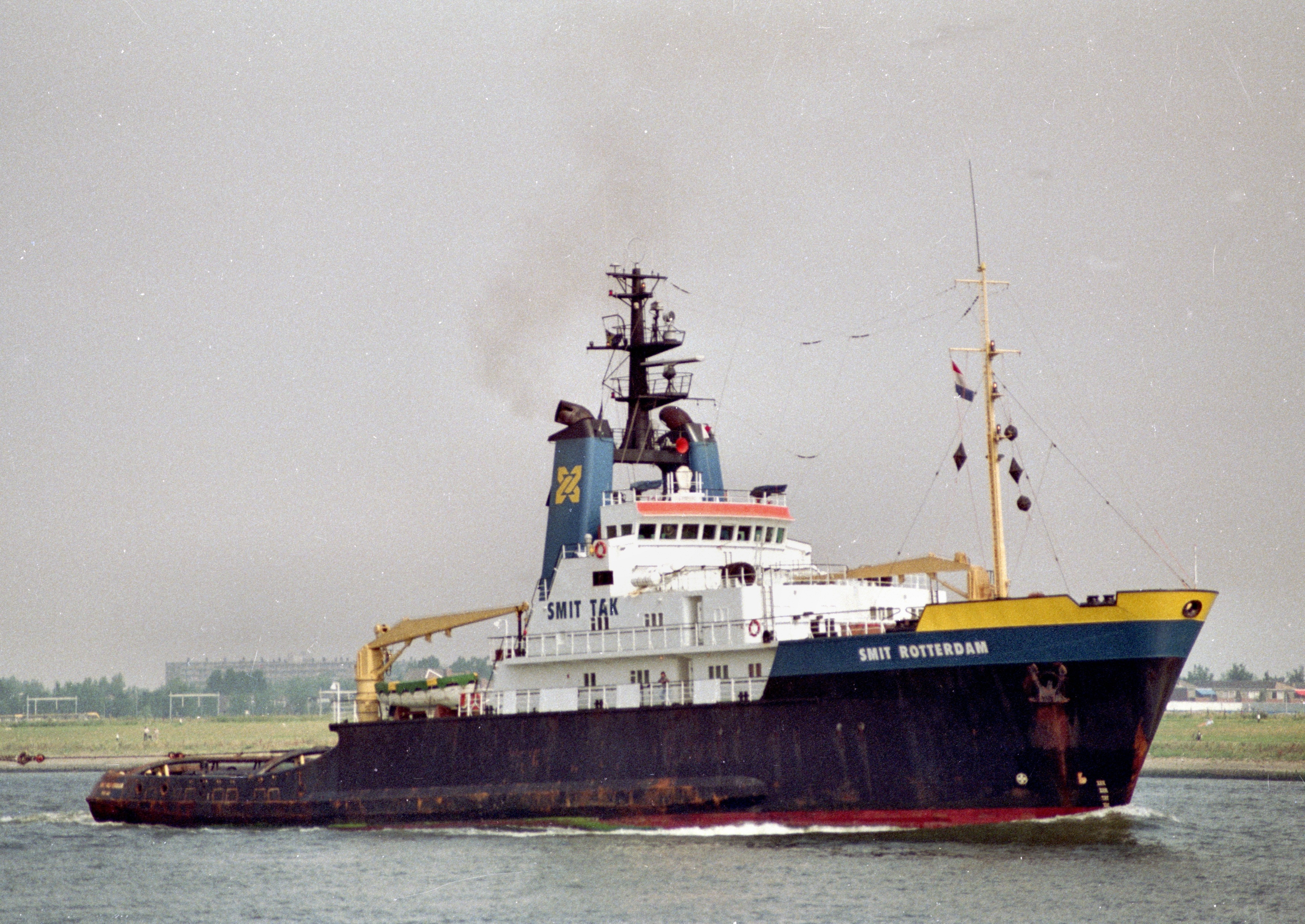
Ocean-going tug Smit Rotterdam arriving with tow at Rotterdam

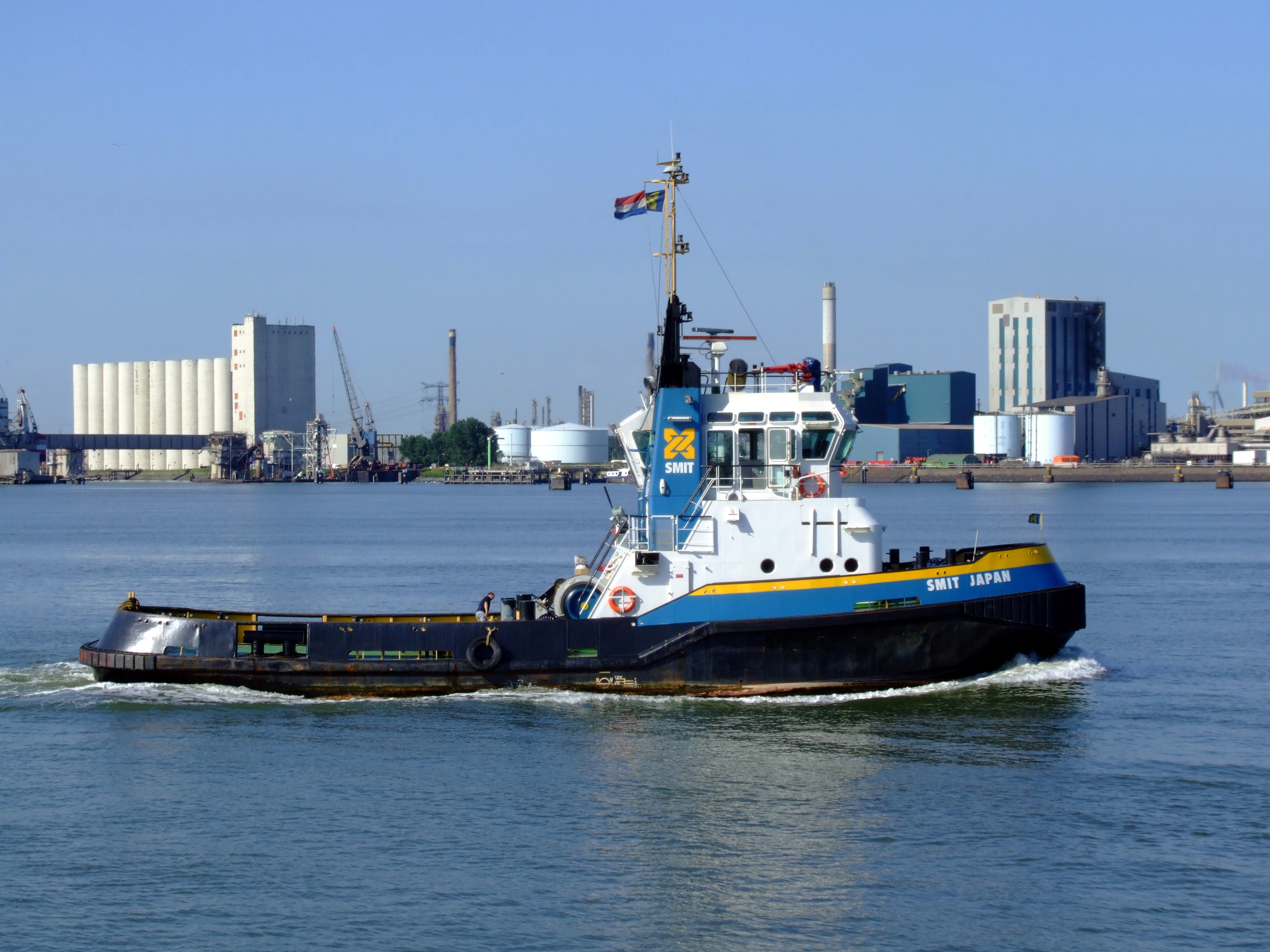
Harbour tug Smit Japan

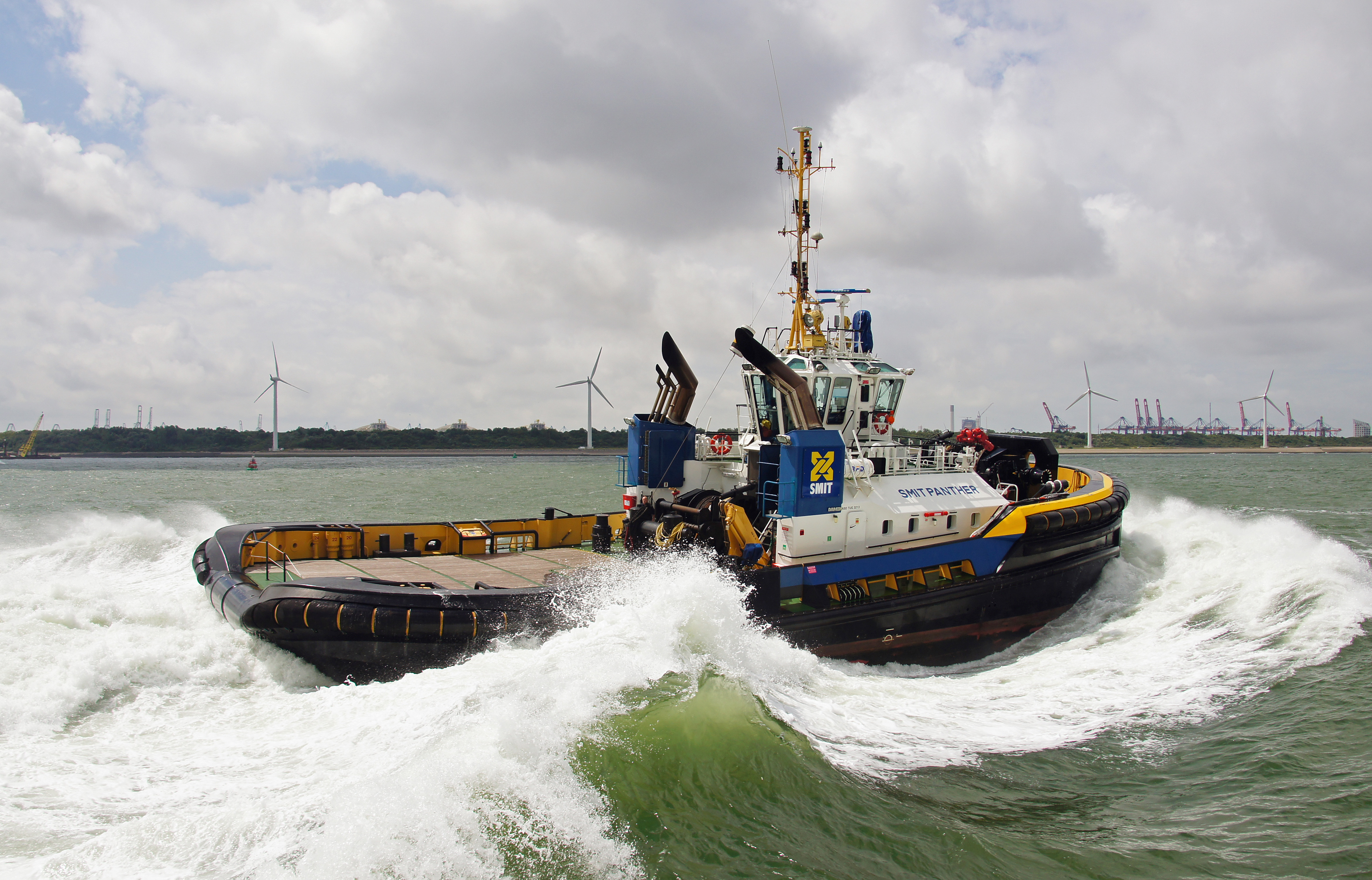
Smit Panther has a 95 t Bollard pull

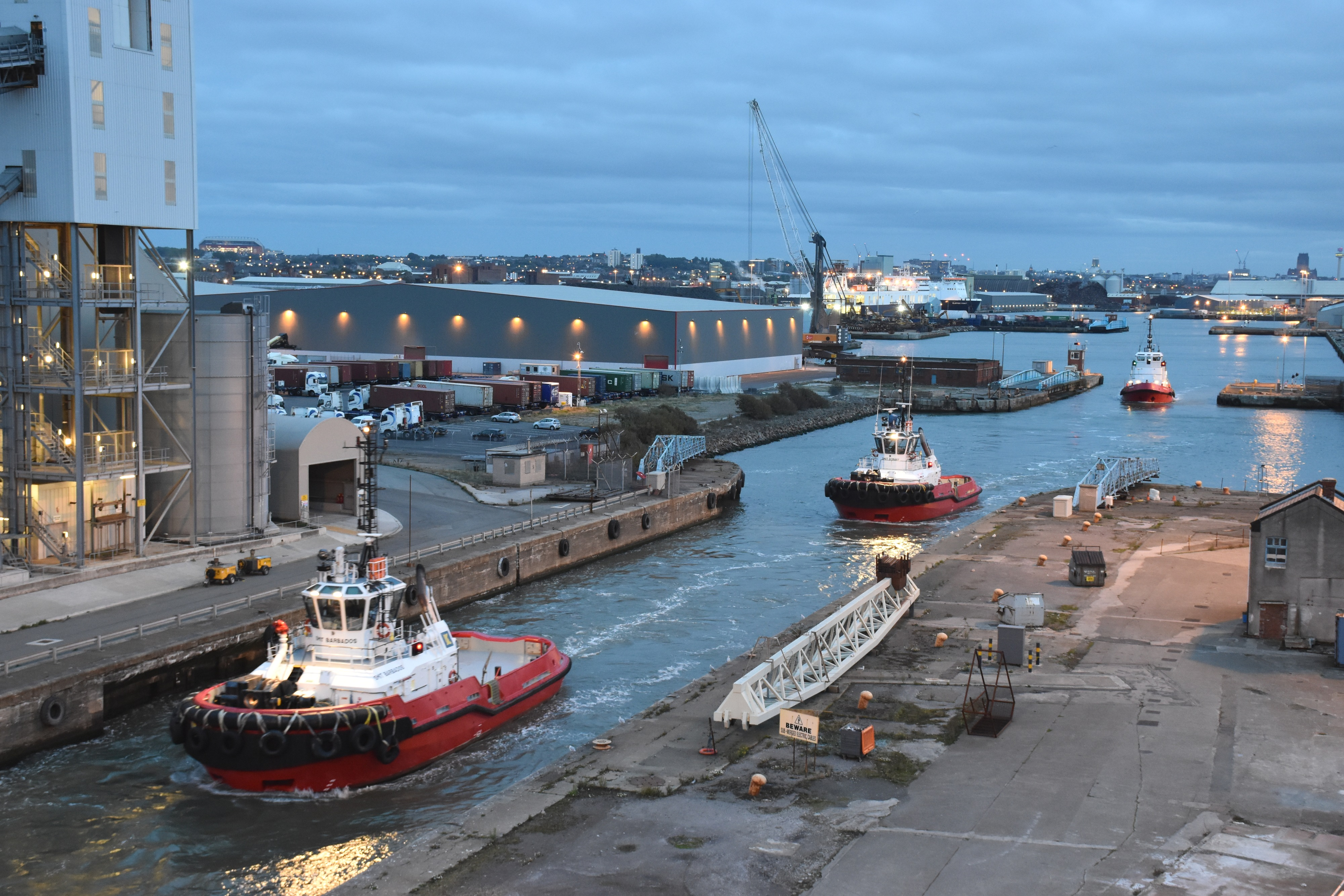
Smit tugs in the Port of Liverpool

Smit Internationale N.V. (or Smit International) is a Dutch company operating in the maritime sector.

Founded in 1842 by Fop Smit, it provided towing services in the Port of Rotterdam. Within its first decades, it branched into shipbuilding and, just after the start of the twentieth century, salvage services. The firm developed an international presence, such as its Singapore-based subsidiary in 1975, and its acquisition of Costain Group's Land & Marine business in 1996.

By 2009, inclusive of its subsidiaries and the joint ventures with controlling stakes, Smit International operated a fleet of 408 ships. Smit International has undertaken the salvage of various vessels, including Costa Concordia, Full City, FSO Safer, MOL Comfort and Kursk.

In 2010, it was acquired by Boskalis and delisted from the Euronext Amsterdam.

== History ==
The company dates back to the early 1840s and the undertakings of Fop Smit, who operated the paddle steamer Kinderdijk to safely guided various other vessels into the Port of Rotterdam. Founded in 1842 under the name L. Smit & Co., it initially focused on towing. Fop's sons, Jan and Leendert, took on management of the company and soon opted to expand its fleet. During 1870, L. Smit & Co. started using tugs with propellers. The business slowly branched into new activities; one such early venture was shipbuilding.

During the mid-1900s, it started providing salvage services for the first time. Throughout the twentieth century, Smit International developed into internationally operating outfit offering a wide range of maritime services. Following the business' merger with Internationale Sleepdienst in 1923, the firm's name was changed to "L. Smit & Co.'s Internationale Sleepdienst".

During 1975, Smit International decided to expand into the Far East via the establishment of a regional office in Singapore. In the following years, it secured work in the provision of salvage and other marine services in the Port of Singapore and the surrounding region. By 2000, the firm's Singapore operation employed in excess of 700 and was roughly valued at $200 million, providing salvage, ocean, port and coastal towage, pipeline installation, horizontal directional drilling and offshore support.

During August 1996, Costain Group's Merseyside based Land & Marine business was purchased for £11.3 million. On 29 March 2007, the firm purchased Adsteam's Liverpool-based towage operation.

Smit International has been involved in the removal of hazardous substances, such as bunker fuel, from wrecks. The company was involved in the containment and removal of fuel oil from the wrecked cruiseliner Costa Concordia, the bulk hauler Full City, and the oil storage vessel FSO Safer in actions that prevented a potential environmental disaster.

The firm has undertaken several notable recovery operations. In the aftermath of the Kursk submarine disaster, Smit International teamed up with the Dutch business Mammoet to recover the lost nuclear submarine. It also performed the salvage of the sunk cargo ship MOL Comfort.

On 15 September 2008, Boskalis made a €1.11 billion takeover offer for Smit. Despite the offer being rejected by Smit's board, Boskalis subsequently built a stake of over 25% in Smit and expressed a continuing desire to buy a number of its business units. A revised offer from Boskalis of €1.35 billion, coupled with a pledge to retain the Smit name and its distinct operations, was accepted by the board in January 2010, with Boskalis declaring its offer unconditional that March having increased its shareholding to 90%. Smit's shares were delisted from Euronext Amsterdam on 4 May 2010.

In February 2018, Britain's Defence Equipment and Support agency signed a deal with Smit International Scotland for the delivery of vessels for safety and training purposes to the Ministry of Defence. One year later, the company, along with Donjon Marine Co., was awarded a contract to provide salvage services for the United States Navy across the majority of the western hemisphere.

== Corporate structure ==
The company consist of four divisions, in order of revenue:

- Transport & Heavy Lift (33.5% of total revenues)
- Salvage (23.9%)
- Harbour Towage (22.8%)
- Terminals (19.8%)

For larger (salvaging) projects the company often uses joint-ventures or combinations. An example of this is Combinatie Berging Tricolor (Dutch for Combination Salvaging Tricolor) which was created solely for the lifting of the MV Tricolor. A similar multi-firm arrangement was made for the 2013-2014 salvage of the Costa Concordia passenger cruise ship.

== Fleet list ==
As of 1 March 2009, Smit, through its subsidiary companies and the joint ventures that it controls, had a fleet of 408 ships.

Type of vessel details on power, tonnage etc.	Harbour Towage	Terminals	Transport & Heavy Lift	Total
Ocean-going tug 14,000-26,000 hp			3	3
Ocean-going tug 6,140 hp	1			1
Anchor handling tugs 10,000-15,000 hp		2	2	4
Anchor handling tugs 8,000 hp		2	4	6
Anchor handling tugs 3,000-8,000 hp		1	20	21
Diving support vessel			2	2
Utility vessels			5	5
Floating sheerlegs seagoing, 3,200 tonnes			1	1
Floating sheerlegs seagoing, <3,200 tonnes			8	8
Pulling barges			2	2
Seagoing barges 24,000 tonnes			3	3
Seagoing barges 1,000-14,000 tonnes	2		1	3
Seagoing barges 1,000-8,000 tonnes	10		19	29
Inland barges 100-2,000 tonnes	28		26	54
Coastal/harbour tugs 3,000-6,000 hp	109	31	2	142
Coastal/harbour tugs 1,000-3,000 hp	37	4	2	43
Harbour/river tugs 100-1,000 hp	9	2	1	12
Harbour/river pusher tugs 480-2,800 hp			5	5
Various vessels work-vessels, oil containment vessels etc.	17	18	29	38
Total fleet	213	60	135	480

== High profile operations ==
Its marine salvage division was involved in several high-profile salvage operations, including:

- SS London Valour (1971–72)
- MT Betelgeuse (1979–80)
- Herald of Free Enterprise (1987)
- Russian submarine Kursk (lifting vessel) (2000)
- Ehime Maru (2001)
- MV Prestige (2002)
- MV Tricolor (lifting vessel) (2002–2003)
- MV Rocknes (2004)
- MV Mighty Servant 3 (2006)
- MS UND Adriyatik (2008)
- Costa Concordia (oil containment) (2012)
- USS Guardian (grounded in Philippines) (2013)
- MOL Comfort sunk in June 2013.
- MV Stellar Banner (2020)
- Ever Given and the 2021 Suez Canal obstruction (2021)
- MV Eemslift Hendrika ship salvation (2021)
- Felicity Ace (2022)
- FSO Safer (2023)

They have also partnered with the French firm JLMD System to support preinstalled fast oil recovery systems, which assure quick reliable oil removal in the event of a shipping accident.
