= MOL Triumph =

Container ship built in 2017

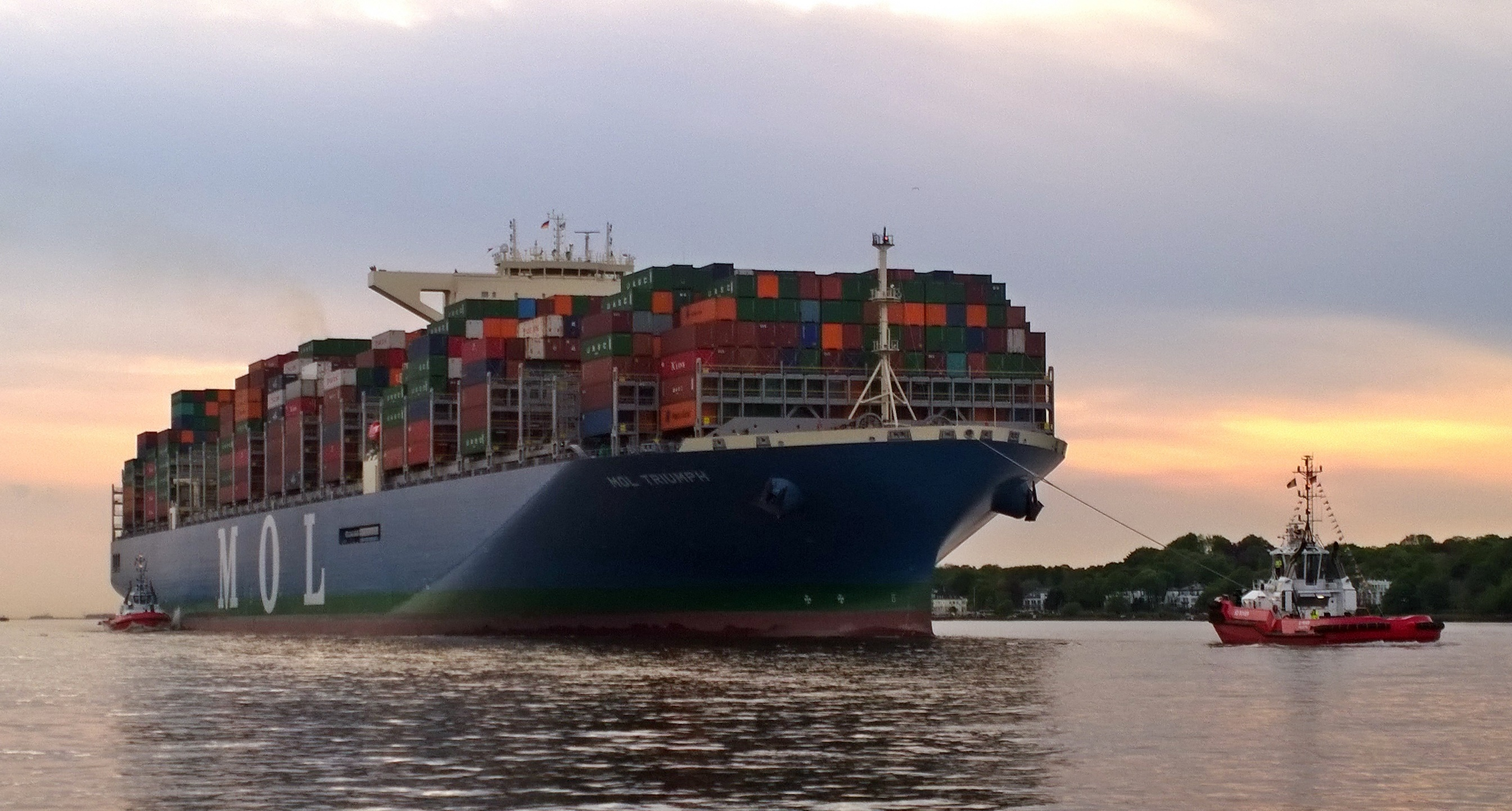
- The MOL Triumph on the river Elbe

History

Marshall Islands
- Name: MOL Triumph
- Owner: Mitsui O.S.K. Lines, Ltd
- Operator: Mitsui O.S.K. Lines
- Builder: Samsung Heavy Industries
- Launched: 18 January 2017
- Identification: Call sign: V7FQ8; IMO number: 9769271; MMSI number: 538007360
- Status: Operational

General characteristics
- Class & type: MOL Triumph-class container ship
- Tonnage: 192,672 DWT
- Length: 400 m (1,312 ft)
- Beam: 58.8 m (193 ft)
- Draft: 16.0 m (52.5 ft)
- Depth: 32.80 m (107.6 ft)
- Installed power: 82,440 kW
- Propulsion: MAN B&W G95ME
- Speed: 24.0 knots (44 km/h) (maximum); 22.0 knots (41 km/h) (cruising)
- Capacity: 20,170 TEU

MOL Triumph is a container ship completed in March 2017 by Samsung Heavy Industries in Geoje, South Korea. The vessel was built for the Japanese shipping operator Mitsui O.S.K. Lines. The ship was christened in a ceremony in South Korea on March 15, 2017. The Triumph has 5 sister ships in its class, the Trust, Tribute, Tradition, Truth, and Treasure.

== Design ==
Triumph has an overall length of 400 m (1,312 ft), width of 58.8 m (193 ft), and maximum summer draft of 16.0 m (52.5 ft). The deadweight of the boxship is 192,672 DWT, while the maximum cargo capacity is 20,170 TEU. The ship has various highly advanced energy-saving technologies including low friction underwater paint, high efficiency rudder and propeller, which reduce the water resistance.

== Engineering ==
Triumph's main engine is the MAN B&W G95ME, with a maximum output power of 82,440 kW. This is enough for the vessel to operate with service speed of 22.0 knots, while the maximum speed is 24.0 knots.

== Service of operations ==
Triumph is deployed at the Alliance’s Asia to Europe trade via the FE2 service. The container ship set off on her maiden voyage from Tianjin in April 2017 and sailed to Dalian, Qingdao, Shanghai, Ningbo, Hong Kong, Yantian and Singapore. She then transited through the Suez Canal and continued on to Tangier, Southampton, Hamburg, Rotterdam and Le Havre. She calls at Tangier and Jebel Ali on the way back to Asia.

In September 2022, during the first 5-year inspection and dry dock turn, the vessel was renamed to "ONE TRIUMPH" and also received a fresh coat of Magenta paint, in line with the colors of the Ocean Network Express, the merger of the three Japanese containervdivisions of Mitsui O.S.K. Lines, NYK Line and K-Line.
