= Combinatie Berging Tricolor =

Combinatie Berging Tricolor (CBT) was a consortium of -mainly- Dutch salvaging companies led by Smit Salvaging BV, a daughter company of Smit International.

== MV Tricolor ==
The consortium was set up to remove the wreck of the MV Tricolor, a Norwegian registered vehicle carrier operated by Wilh. Wilhelmsen. The consortium consisted of Smit Salvage BV, Scaldis Salvage & Marine Contractors NV, URS Salvage & Marine Contracting NV and Multraship Salvage BV. The contract for the wreck-removal with this consortium was signed on 11 April 2003.

Starting in July 2003, the operation was declared complete on October 27, 2004. The salvage method included a carbide-encrusted cutting wire used to slice the wreck into nine sections of 3000 tonnes each. This technique was similar to one Smit had used in salvaging the Russian submarine, K-141 Kursk.

CBT received the contract to remove the wreck from the (busy) area where she was lying, which was approximately 20 miles north of the French coast, inside the French Exclusive economic zone and territorial waters. The contract with the operator of the MV Tricilor was signed on 11 April 2003.
