= Felicity Ace =

Vehicle carrier which sank in 2022

Coordinates: 37.52861°N 28.98560°W

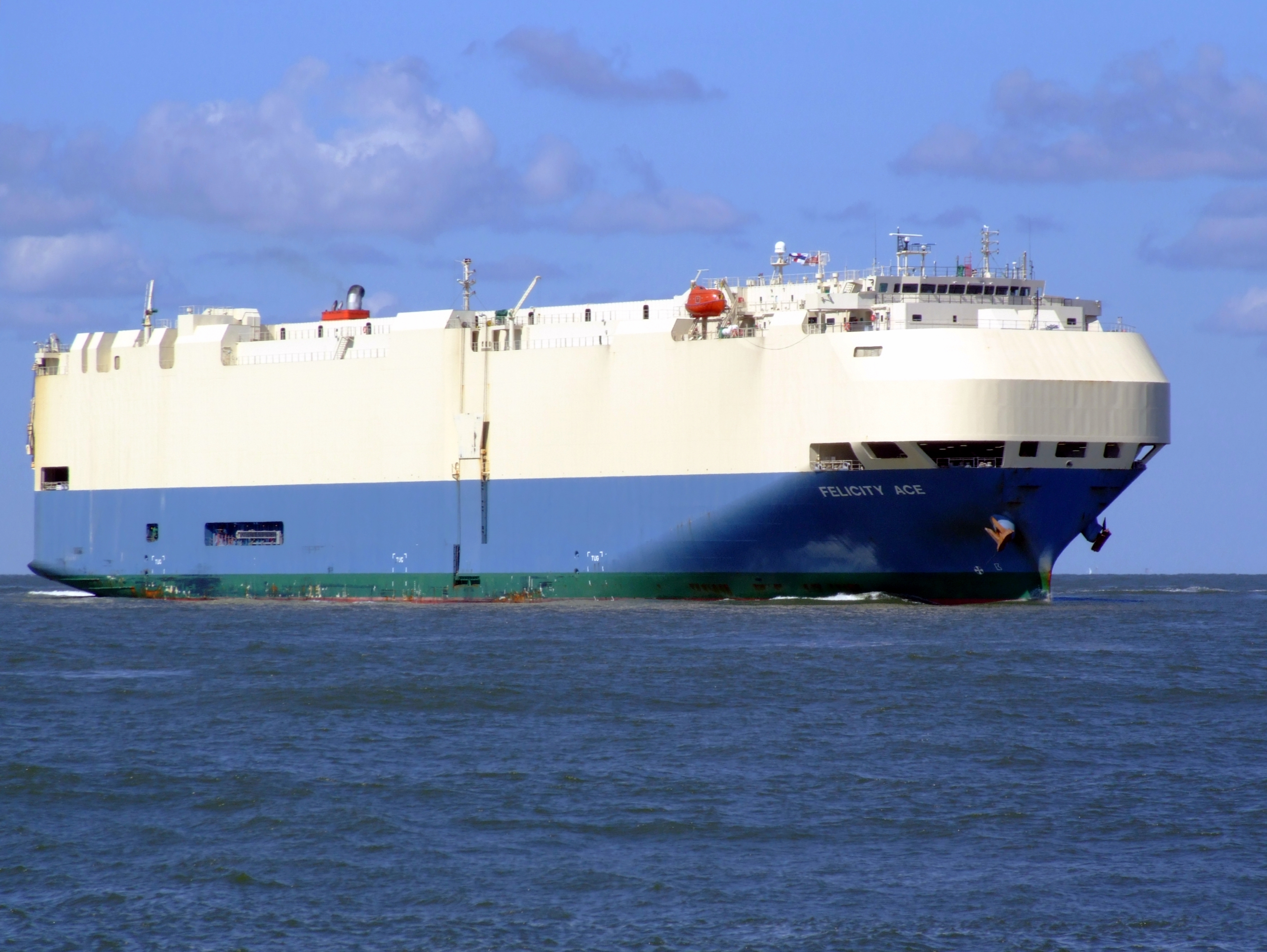
- Felicity Ace at the Port of Rotterdam, the Netherlands.

History
- Name: Felicity Ace
- Owner: 2005-2011 Aurora Car Maritime Transport; 2011-2022 Snowscape Car Carriers
- Operator: Mitsui O.S.K. Lines
- Port of registry: Panama City, Panama
- Builder: Shin Kurushima Dockyard
- Yard number: 5306
- Laid down: 9 December 2004
- Launched: 2 July 2005
- Completed: 5 October 2005
- Identification: Callsign: 3ECX4; IMO number: 9293911; MMSI number: 371427000
- Fate: Capsized and sank on 1 March 2022 after a fire

General characteristics
- Class & type: Nippon Kaiji Kyōkai cargo ship
- Type: Ro-Ro car carrier
- Tonnage: 60,118 GT
- Displacement: 17,738 t (17,458 long tons)
- Length: 200 m (656 ft)
- Beam: 32.26 m (105.8 ft)
- Installed power: 1 diesel engine rated at 15,286 kW (20,500 hp)
- Propulsion: single shaft, 1 propeller
- Speed: 22.3 knots (41.3 km/h; 25.7 mph)

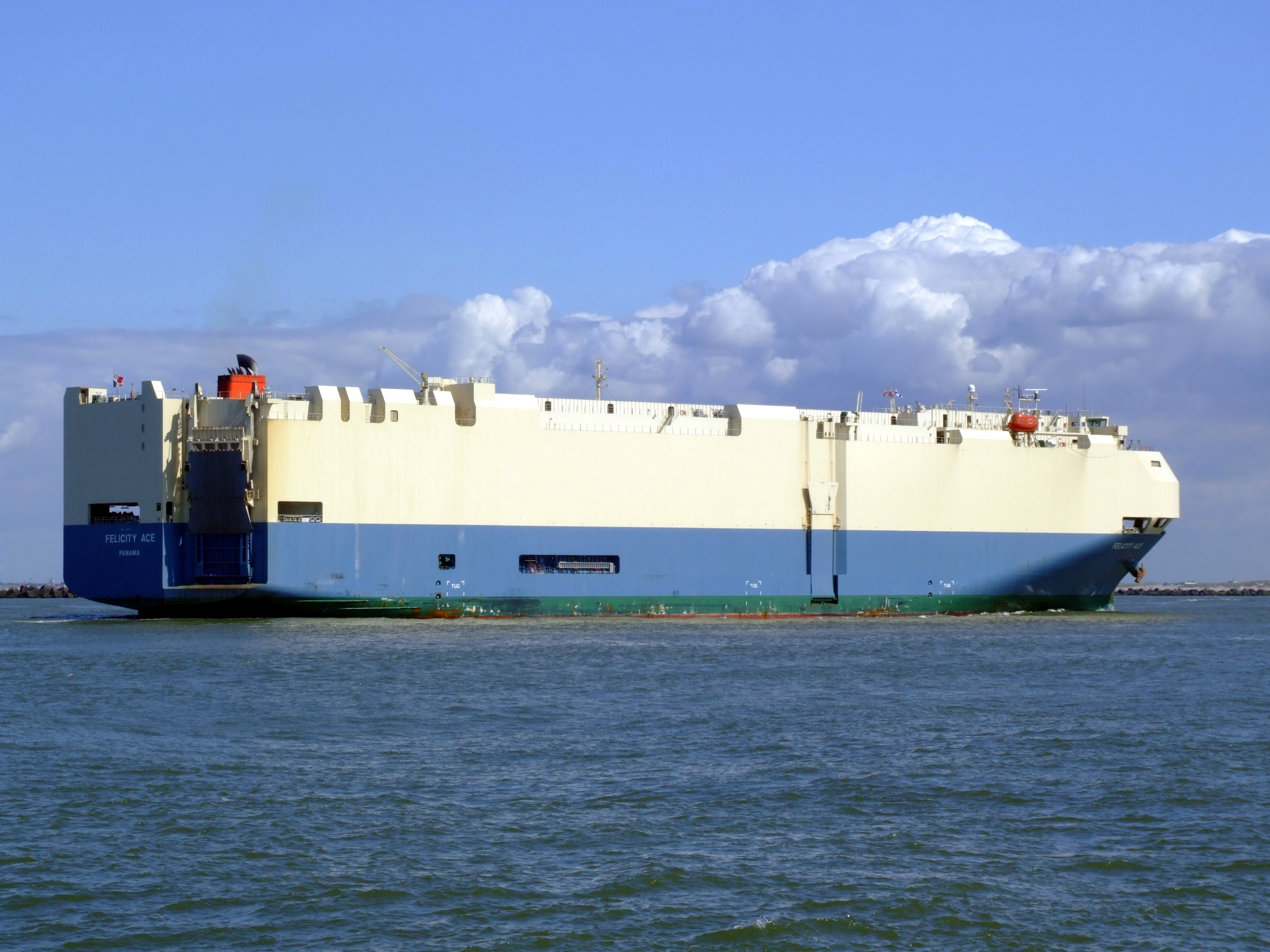
Rear view

Felicity Ace was a 60,000 tonne roll-on/roll-off cargo ship (pure car/truck carrier) built by Shin Kurushima Dockyard in 2005. It was owned and operated by Mitsui O.S.K. Lines of Japan, and the ship was registered in Panama.

The ship caught fire in February 2022 south of the Azores, while transporting vehicles from Germany to the United States — subsequently capsizing and sinking in early March, carrying cargo with an estimated worth over $400 million.

== Design and construction ==
Felicity Ace was designed for the dedicated carriage of cars and trucks. The length of the vessel was 200 m (656 ft), the beam 32.26 m (105.8 ft) and the service draught 9.7 m (32 ft). The vessel's deadweight was 17,738 tonnes, with a gross tonnage of 60,118. It was powered by a single main diesel engine rated at 15,286 kW (20,500 hp), giving a service speed of 22.3 knots (41.3 km/h; 25.7 mph).

The ship was built at Shin Kurushima Dockyard's Ōnishi facility in Imabari, Ehime, Japan, at Yard No. 5306 for Mitsui O.S.K. Lines (MOL) of Japan and issued with IMO number 9293911. The ship's keel was laid on 9 December 2004, and it was launched on 2 July 2005. Felicity Ace was completed on 5 October 2005 and delivered to MOL in the registered ownership of Aurora Car Maritime Transport SA under the Panamanian flag. From 2011 her registered owner was Snowscape Car Carriers SA, remaining under MOL group management.

== 2022 fire ==
The ship sailed from Emden, Germany, on 10 February 2022, carrying 3,965 Volkswagen Group cars, including Audi, Porsche, Lamborghini and Bentley models.

The cargo section caught fire on 16 February 2022, while crossing the North Atlantic heading for Davisville, Rhode Island. At that time, the ship was about 320 kilometres (200 mi) from Terceira Island in the Azores. All 22 crew members abandoned ship and survived, being evacuated by the Portuguese Navy. The Azorean harbourmaster told Reuters that lithium-ion batteries in electric cars had ignited and the fire could only be extinguished with special equipment. Contrary to speculations in the media, it is unknown whether an electric car caused the initial fire.

Felicity Ace was being followed by the Portuguese Navy patrol ship NRP Setúbal, approximately 170 kilometres (110 mi) southwest of the Azores, waiting for rescuers to try to extinguish the fire and tow the vessel to shore. On 18 February, Smit Salvage were contracted to salvage the ship.

Two large tugs with firefighting equipment were ordered to support the vessel from Gibraltar. In addition, a salvage craft with firefighting equipment was set to arrive from Rotterdam on 23 or 24 February. A Portuguese Navy spokesman said that Felicity Ace was unlikely to be towed to a port in the Azores due to its size.

The ship drifted and burned in the Atlantic for about a week. After the fire was extinguished, a team from Smit was able to board and stabilize the ship, and a towing connection to a tug was established.

== Sinking ==
On 1 March 2022, Felicity Ace was reported to have capsized and sunk. A Mitsui O.S.K. Lines (MOL) spokesperson said that the ship developed a 45-degree starboard list and unexpectedly capsized at approximately 9 am local time about 350 km (220 mi) off the Azores in rough seas. MOL was unable to confirm if any oil pollution had occurred. The Portuguese Navy said oily residue and wreckage was visible at the surface, the water was about 3,000 m (9,800 ft) deep at the sinking site, and that naval forces would continue to monitor the area.

== Vehicles lost ==
Porsche lost 1,117 cars on the ship, Audi claimed a loss of 1,944 vehicles, Volkswagen lost 561, Bentley lost 189, and Lamborghini lost 85 cars.

In addition to numerous family vehicles, including Volkswagen ID.4 and Audi e-tron electric cars, the ship carried fifteen high performance Lamborghini Aventador LP 780-4 Ultimae vehicles, with an estimated retail price above US$500,000 each. The Ultimae was the last edition of the Aventador to be produced, and at the time of the accident, Aventador production had ended. The ship also carried some privately owned cars and trucks of varying makes and models along with numerous tractors. Lamborghini had rebuilt these 15 lost models, and the last one being designed like a Miura P400.

Analysts estimated the damage caused by the cargo loss to be between US$334 million and US$401 million.

== Insurance claims ==
By 2024 Volkswagen still faced lawsuits in Germany from plaintiffs, including Mitsui O.S.K. Lines, and Allianz SE, one of the insurers of the vessel, over claims it was the battery in a Porsche electric vehicle that triggered the fire on board. Claimants allege that VW failed to inform them of the danger and necessary precautions needed when transporting such EVs.

== See also ==
- List of roll-on/roll-off vessel accidents
