= Collision of MSC Prestige and MV Samco Europe =

Maritime collision

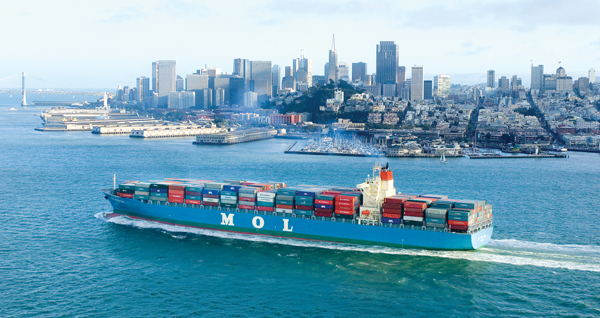
The MSC Prestige in the San Francisco Bay area in 2006

On 7 December 2007, the container ship MSC Prestige (IMO 9321029) collided with a large tanker MV Samco Europe, off the Red Sea traffic separation scheme of Bab-el-Mandeb. Both vessels suffered severe damage at their bows and had to undergo major repairs. The collision caused more than $50 million in damage.

An official report was compiled. The MSC Prestige was subsequently renamed back to MOL Prestige.

== Legal case ==
The fault was ruled to be due to both vessels, but 60% of the blame was apportioned to the MSC Prestige because it failed to keep a good radar and visual lookout, and failed to substantially take action to stop the collision. The Samco Europe was ruled partially at fault because it failed to have a good lookout when it realized the MSC Prestige was altering course to starboard.
