= Auriga (disambiguation) =

Auriga is a constellation.

Auriga or AURIGA may also refer to:

- Auriga (slave), a Roman charioteer
- HMS Auriga (P419), a British submarine launched in 1945
- Auriga of Delphi, name of the statue Charioteer of Delphi
- USM Auriga, a fictional spaceship in the film Alien Resurrection
- Auriga, a fictional planet in the Endless franchise by Amplitude Studios
- AURIGA, a gravitational wave detector in Italy
- Auriga-1.2V (Аурига-1.2В), a Russian satellite communications system, and a component of the MK VTR-016 (МК ВТР-016) mobile video transmission system
- SS Auriga, a number of steamships with this name; it is also the name of a diesel ship (MSC Orion-class container ship)
