= K Line =

Japanese shipping company

Kawasaki Kisen Kaisha, Ltd.

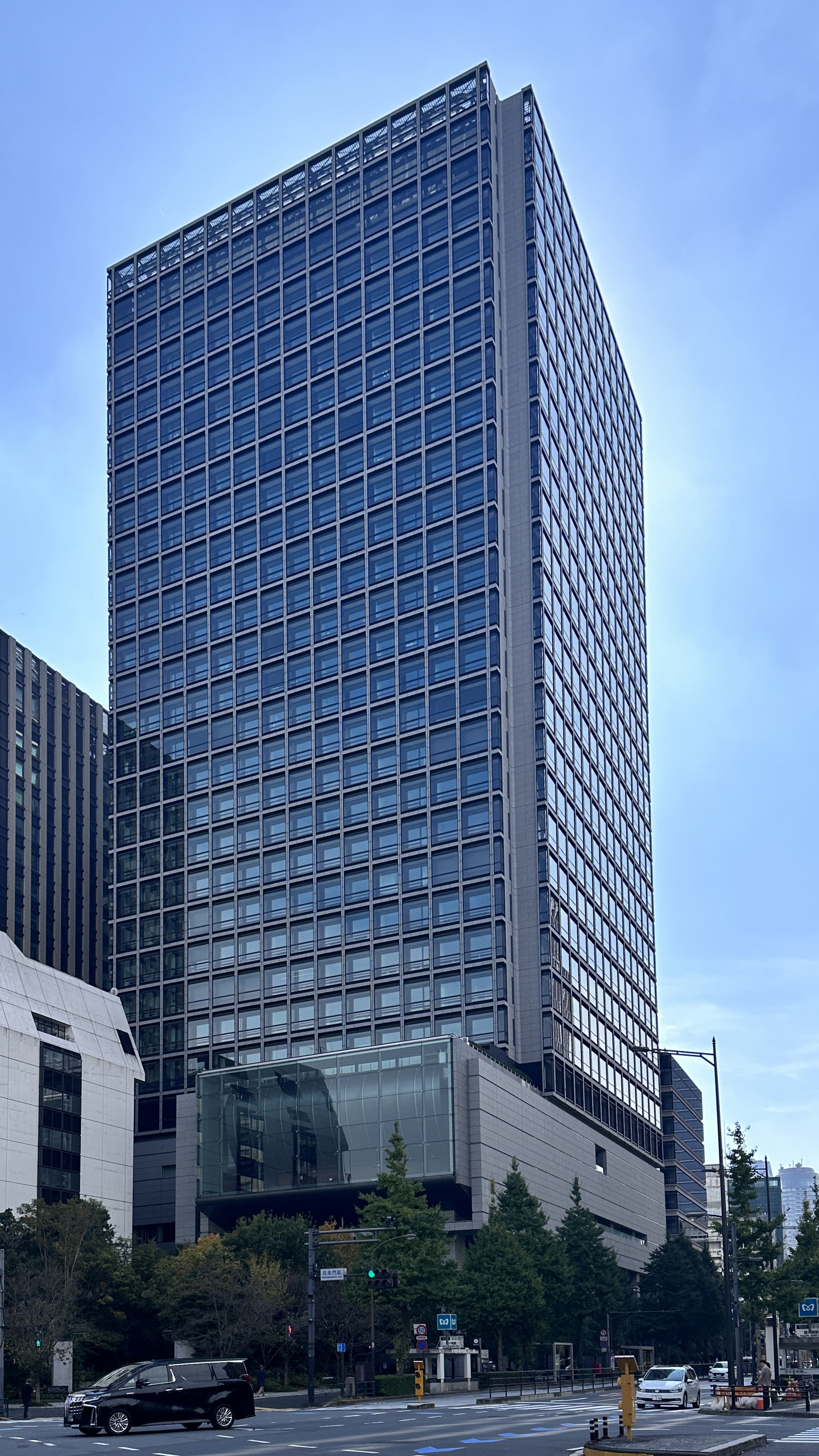
- Headquarters in Chiyoda, Tokyo
- Trade name: "K" Line
- Type: Public KK
- Traded as: TYO: 9107; ~~OSE: 9107~~; NAG: 9107; FSE: 9107
- Industry: Transport
- Founded: 1919; 107 years ago
- Founder: Kojiro Matsukata
- Headquarters: Uchisaiwaichō, Chiyoda, Tokyo, Japan
- Key people: Iyazu Tokogawa (CEO); Shigeru Masuda, MBA (COO); Hideyoshi Yamamoto (CFO)
- Subsidiaries: International Transportation Service
- Website: www.kline.co.jp

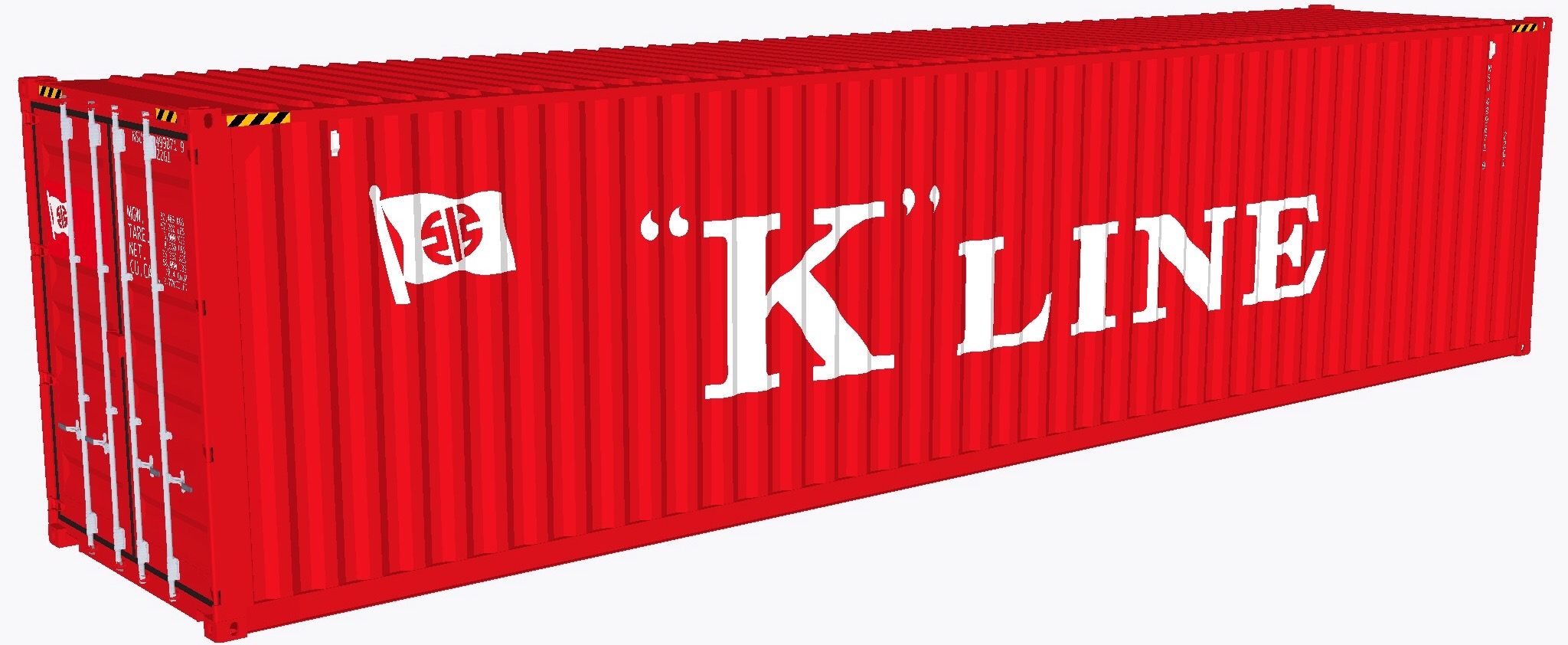
K Line container

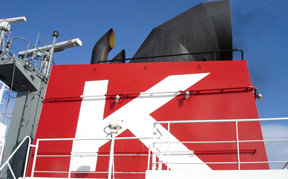
Smokestack of a K Line vessel.

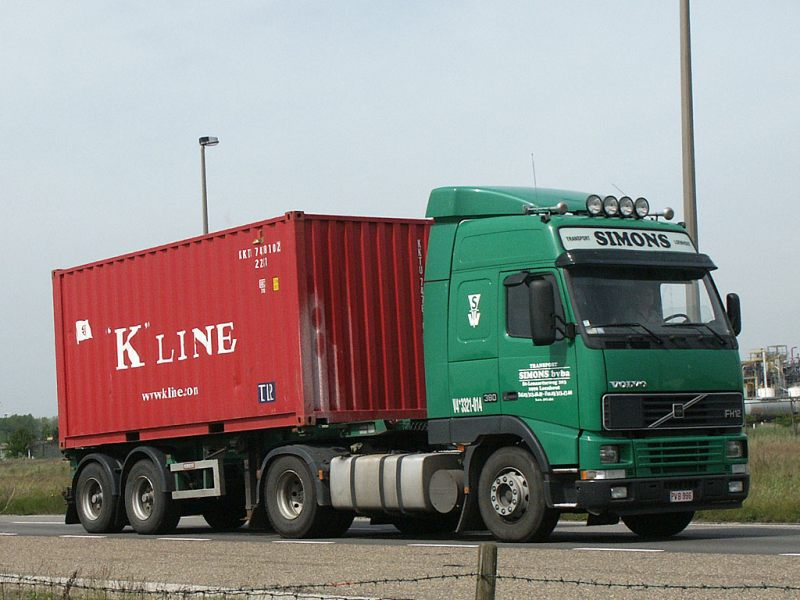
A K Line container mounted on a trailer is on a road in Belgium.

Kawasaki Kisen Kaisha, Ltd. (川崎汽船株式会社, Kawasaki Kisen Kabushiki gaisha; branded as "K" Line) is a Japanese transportation company. It owns a fleet that includes dry cargo ships (bulk carriers), container ships, liquefied natural gas carriers, Ro-Ro ships, tankers, and container terminals. It used to be the fourteenth largest container transportation and shipping company in the world, before becoming part of Ocean Network Express in 2017.

== History ==
House flag

=== 1919–1944 ===
"K" Line traces its origin to Kawasaki Heavy Industries, which itself was born in 1878, when founder and entrepreneur Kawasaki Shōzō established Kawasaki Tsukiji Shipyard in Tokyo, Japan, which, eighteen years later, in 1896, was incorporated as Kawasaki Dockyard Co., Ltd.

The shipping activities were developed when Kawasaki Dockyard Co., Ltd. (predecessor of Kawasaki Heavy Industries)'s President Kojiro Matsukata, decided to develop shipping services so as to provide business to Kawasaki Dockyard and to serve Japan's national industrial and trade interests.

To do so, he placed Kawasaki Kisen, Kawasaki Zosen and Kokusai Kisen under joint management to build a stronger fleet of 40 to 50 ships serving the Atlantic, North and South America, Africa and the Mediterranean and Baltic Seas.

The three firms' initials were combined to form the moniker "K Line" in 1921.

K Line founder, Kojiro Matsukata, was also known as an art collector. The National Museum of Western Art in Tokyo's Ueno Park was established around the core of Matsukata's private collection. The Tokyo National Museum houses his extensive collection of Ukiyo-eprints.

In 1926, according to Lloyds, the newly established "K" Line reached the rank of 13th in the world, behind compatriots NYK (9th) but ahead of O.S.K. (14th).

By the end of World War II, Kawasaki Kisen had lost 56 vessels. 12 survived.

Prior to World War II, the holding company Kawasaki Heavy Industries was part of the Kobe Kawasaki zaibatsu, which included Kawasaki Steel and Kawasaki Kisen. After the war, KHI became part of the DKB Group (keiretsu).

=== 1945–1961 ===
During that vital recovery period, "K" Line steadily returned to the building and operation of ships, reestablished bases of operation around the world, increased earnings and took other steps to restore corporate strength and vibrancy of the company.

=== 1962–1967 ===
After the merger with Iino Kisen, "K" Line was newly capitalized at ¥9 billion and controlled a fleet of 104 ships, 55 of which were also owned by "K" Line. The merger made "K" Line one of the world's largest shipping lines in terms of fleet size.

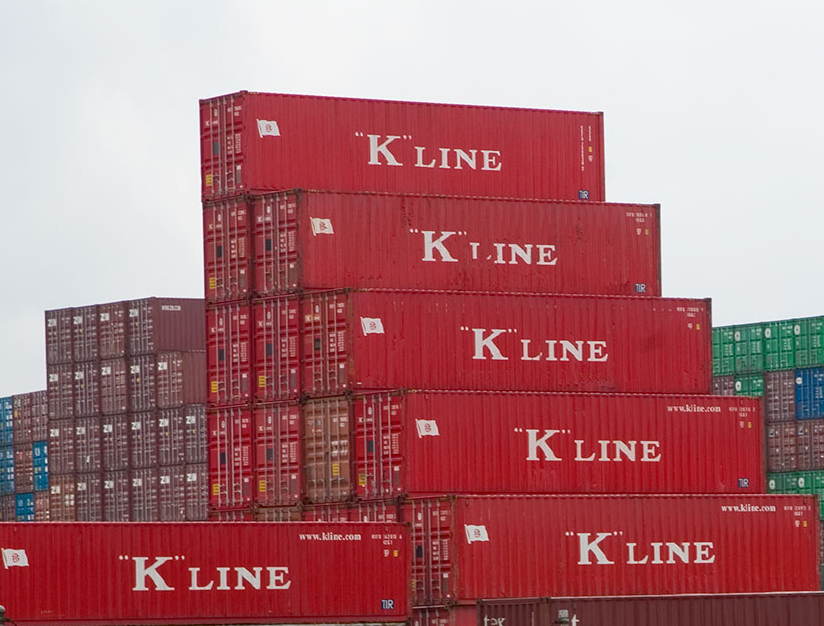
K-Line containers

=== 1971 ===
K Line opens International Transportation Service, a container terminal company in the Port of Long Beach.

The Car Carrier transport division was inaugurated with the launch of the new roll-on/roll-off (RORO) vessel Toyota Maru No. 10. K-Line would thereafter enlarge the fleet up to 70 car carrier vessels. All owned RORO vessels started to include in the first part of their names the word "highway" (opposite to its container fleet's vessels that include the word "bridge" into their names), to symbolize a link in between Japan and the rest of the world served by sea.

=== 2003 ===
KESS - K Line Europe Short Sea was inaugurated in July 2003 in Germany, as a dedicated feeder operator in Europe specialized in brand new cars shipping in between European, Scandinavian, Baltic and Mediterranean ports. The company tonnage is composed of 11 RORO ships.

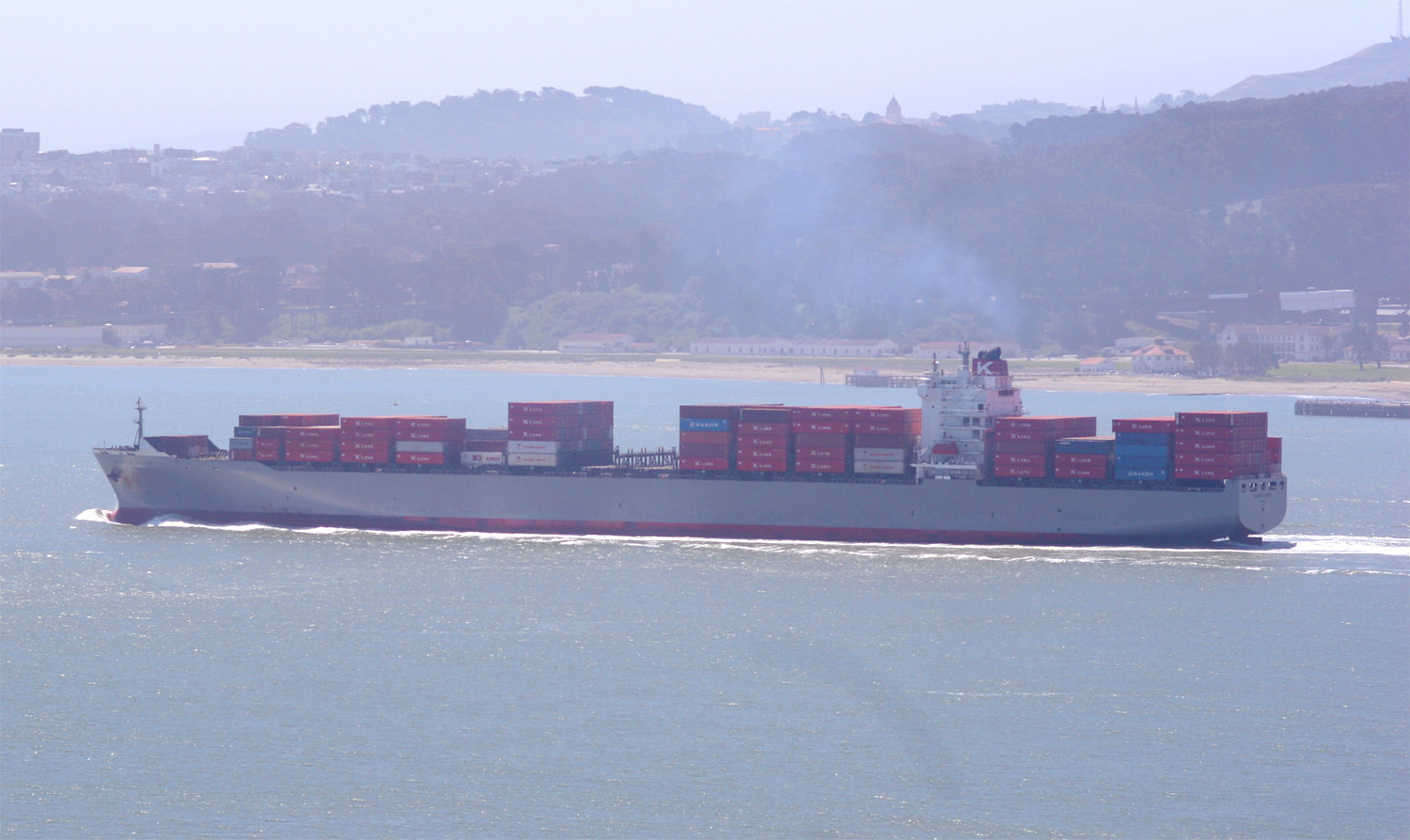
K-line container ship Valencia Bridge steaming into San Francisco Bay, June 2007

=== 2007 ===
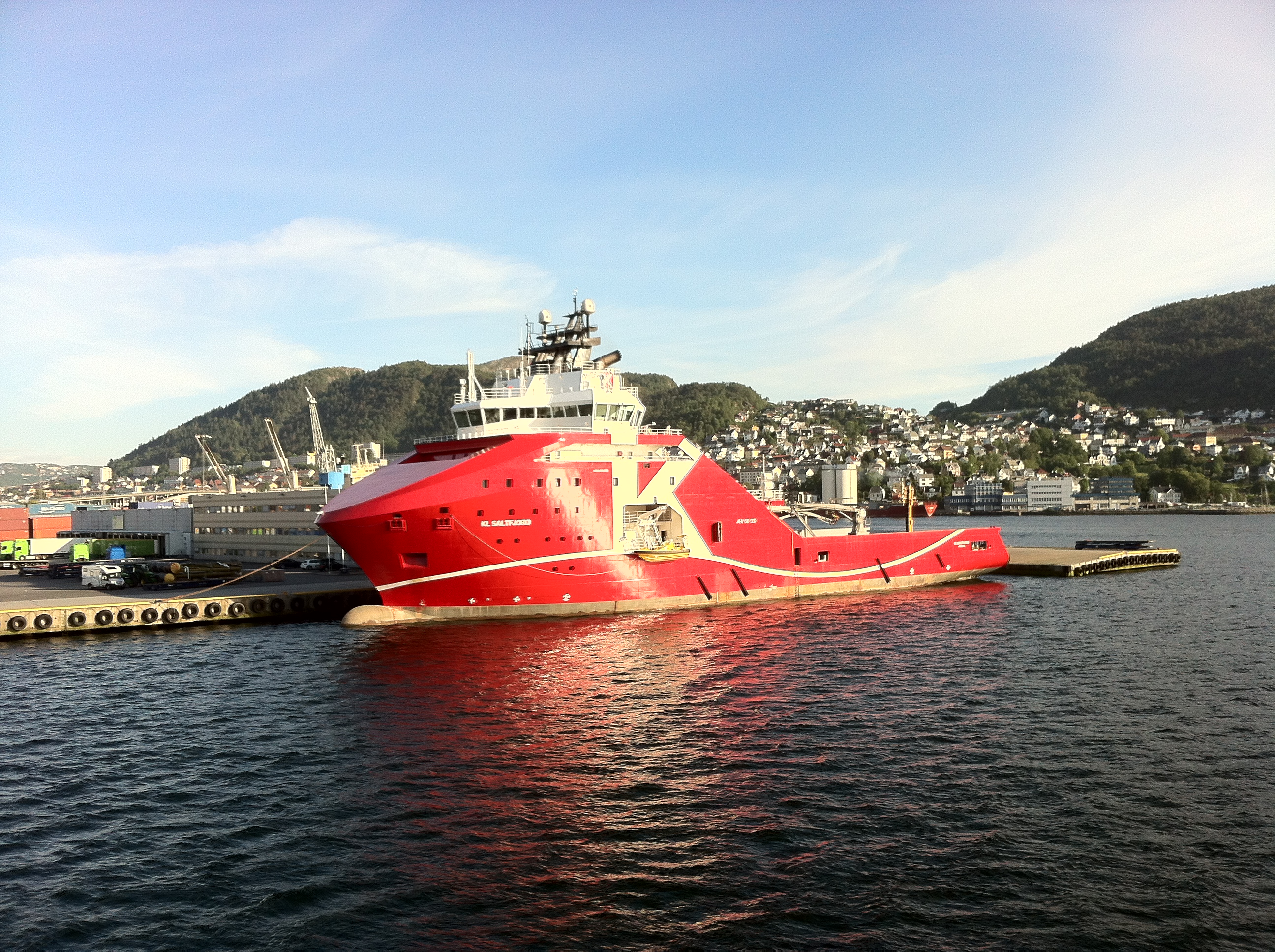
KL Saltfjord in Bergen harbour

K Line Offshore AS was founded in Arendal, Norway in October 2007 as a subsidiary of K Line to provide offshore support services to oil and gas fields. They have commissioned new ships suitable for oil and gas fields in ultra-deep water, harsh environments and/or remote areas.

In September 2007, Shuichiro Maeda, K-Line president, said the company will build ten cargo ships to be manned by an all-Filipino officers and crew. The vessels are expected to be finished by 2010. They employed 7,000 Filipinos in the next four years (3,330 officers and 3,600 ratings or crew). K-Line built the K-Line Maritime Academy-Philippines, operational in February 2008 and intends to train at least 10,000 seafarers a year.

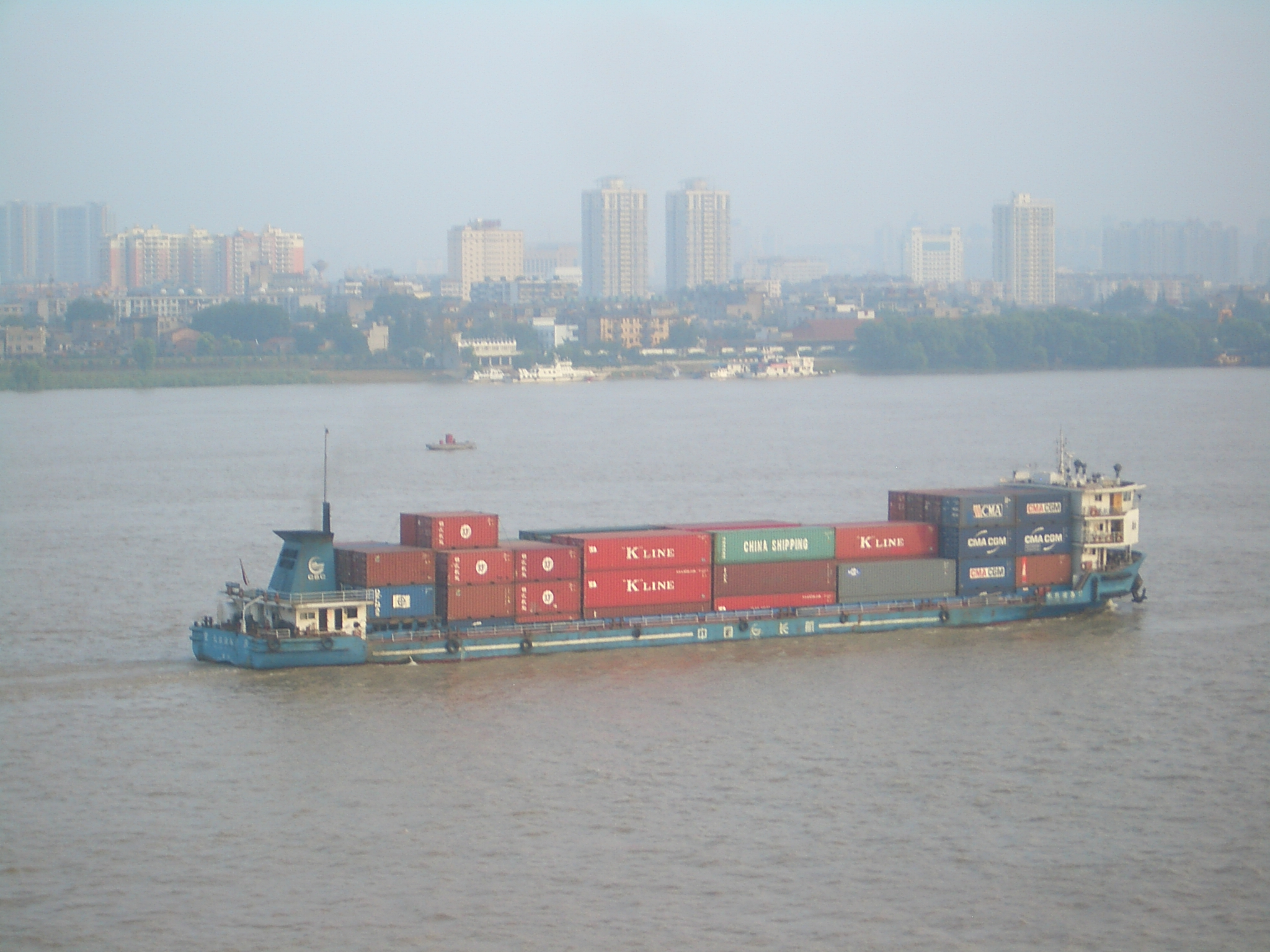
K Line containers aboard a Chinese boat on the Yangtze in Wuhan

=== 2017 ===
In 2017, K Line, Nippon Yusen (NYK) and Mitsui O.S.K. Lines (MOL) announced that they would merge and jointly operate their global container shipping services as Ocean Network Express (ONE), in order to better compete against other global container shipping groups. ONE would merge all container shipping services of the three companies, as well as their port terminal operating subsidiaries in various countries, except in Japan, while keeping their other shipping services separate. ONE began operations in April 2018. with the company headquarters in Tokyo, Japan, a business operation headquarters in Singapore and regional headquarters in: London, United Kingdom; Richmond, Virginia; and São Paulo, Brazil.

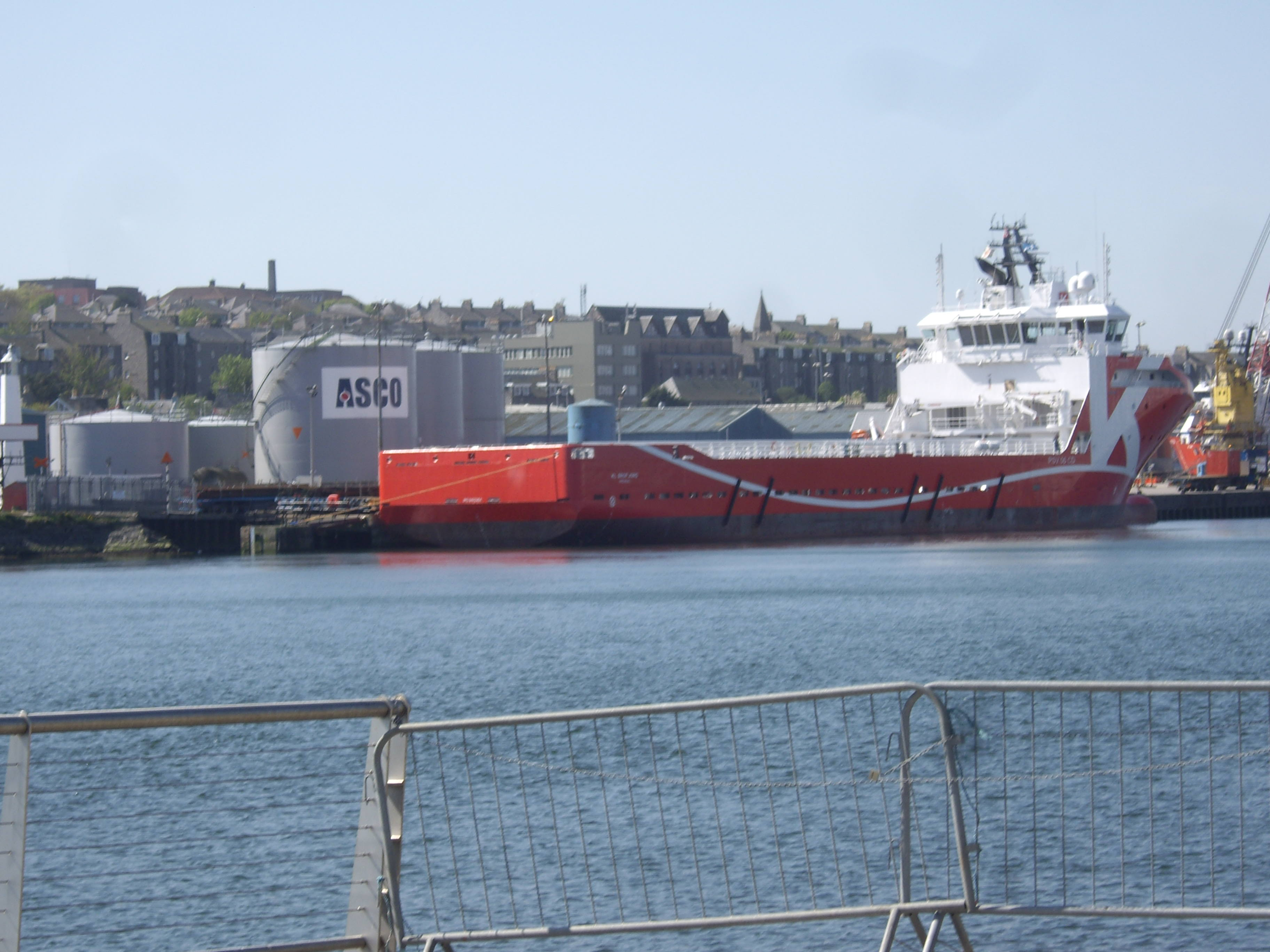
K-Line offshore ship in the harbor of Aberdeen, United Kingdom

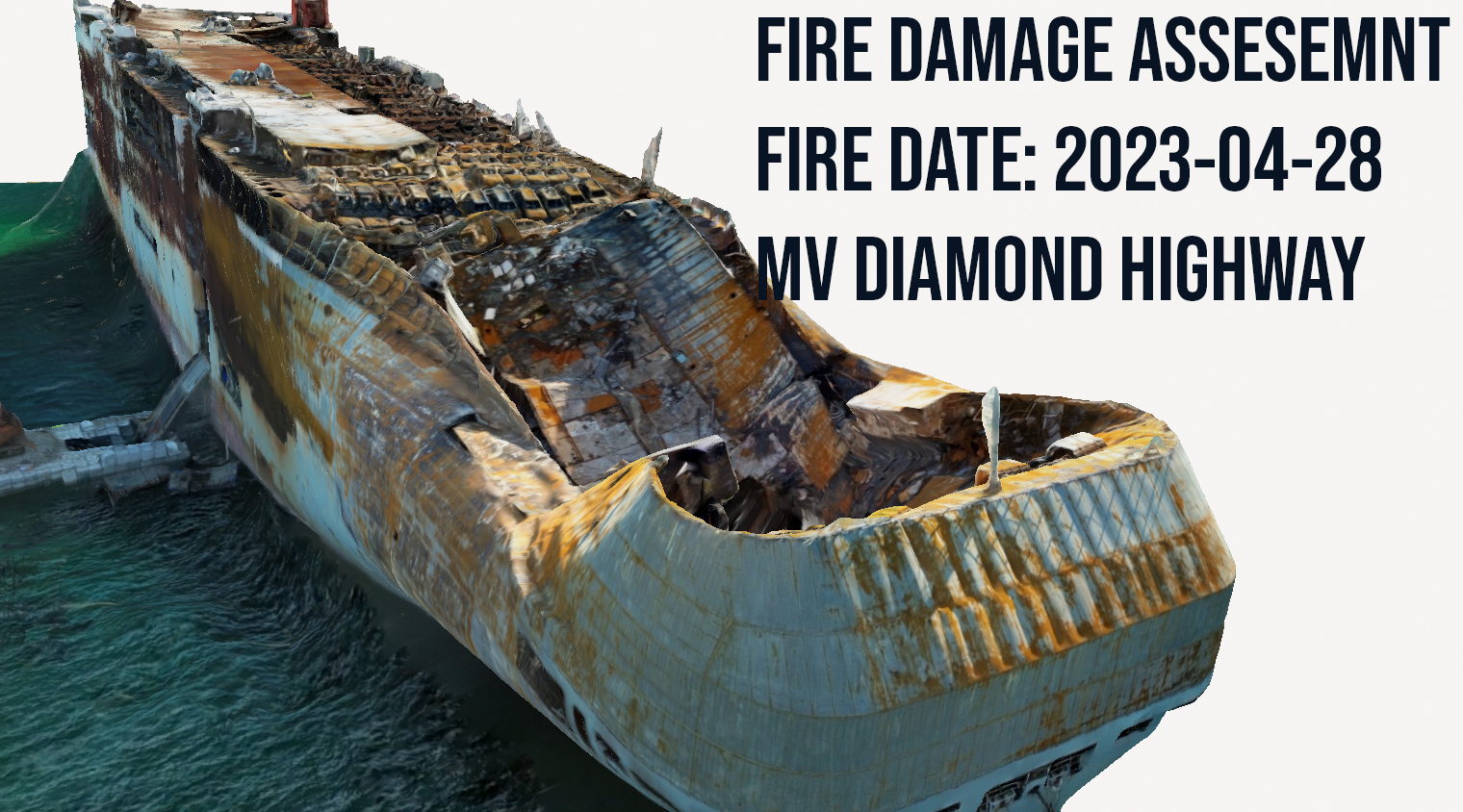
Hull of vessel Diamond Highway burned on 28 April 2023 in baranagy Punta Engano, Lapu Lapu City

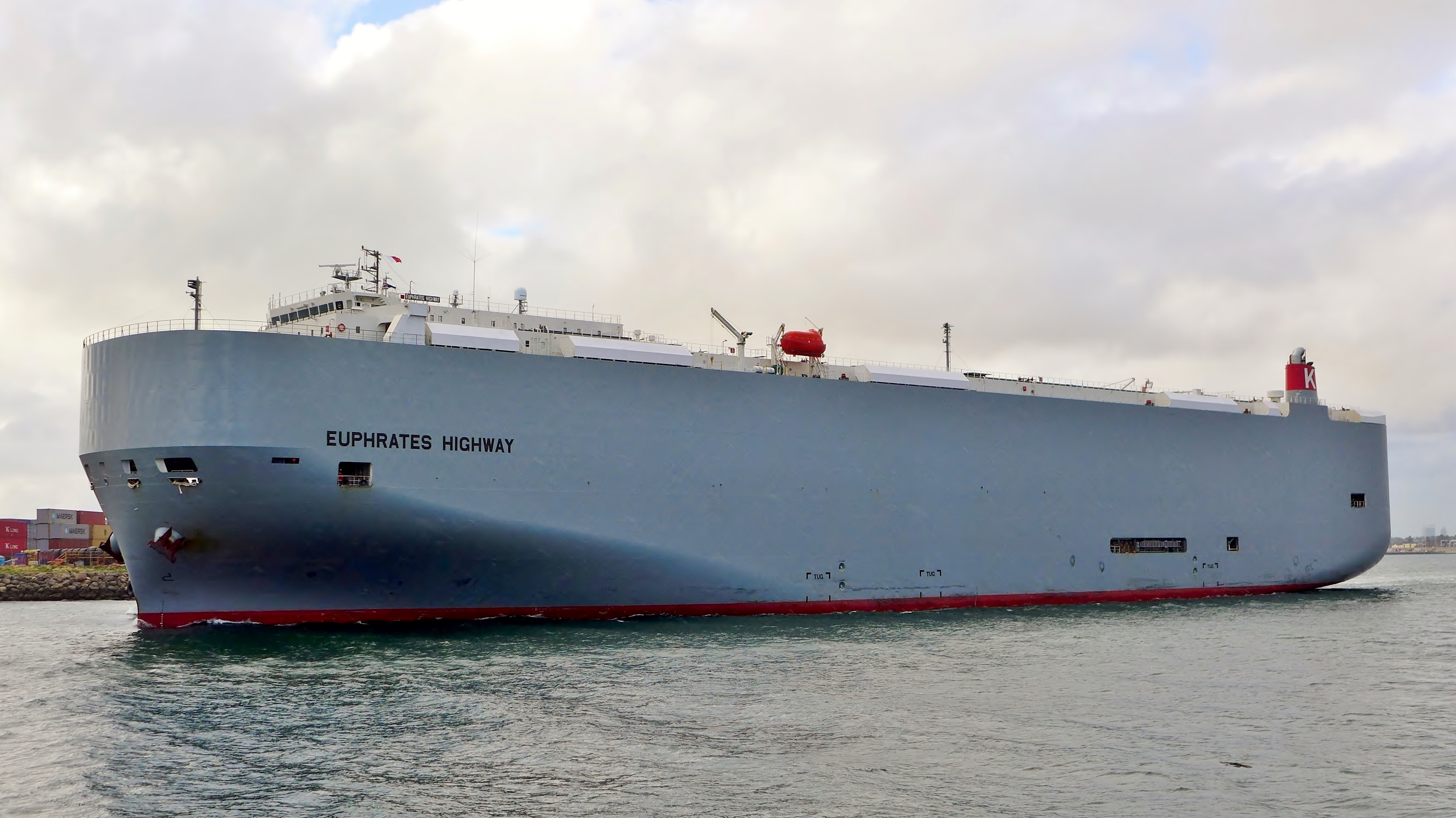
Car carrier Euphrates Highway

=== 2018 ===
On 23 July, KESS car carrier Makassar Highway ran hard aground at full speed in the Tjust archipelago near Loftahammar, Sweden, causing an oil spill. By his own account, the captain had ordered a course close to land, far from established shipping lanes, in order to gain mobile phone reception. The ship's satellite communication system and black box were inoperable when departing Cuxhaven for Södertälje, and alarm systems had been disabled. The Swedish Coast Guard recovered approximately 7,000 litres (1,500 imp gal; 1,800 US gal) of oil by 30 July, but thousands of litres of oil washed up on the coast.

An estimated 14,000 litres (3,100 imp gal; 3,700 US gal) of oil were spilled. The ship was towed to Oskarshamn, where its cargo of 1,325 vehicles were offloaded. The chief mate was taken into custody and accepted a fine for intoxication and recklessness in maritime traffic. His blood alcohol content by mass at the time of the accident was estimated at 1.15 permille, based on samples taken after the incident. The oil spill is also being investigated as an environmental crime.

A few months earlier, Makassar Highway had collided with the dredger Xiang Wang Cai 17 near the Chinese city of Zhangzhou. According to investigations, Makassar Highway was also responsible for the collision.

=== 2019 ===
On 15 June 2019, the car carrier Diamond Highway caught fire while sailing in between the ports of Singapore and Batangas. The Philippine Coast Guard was alerted, and a mission to rescue the 25 members of the crew was undertaken by another car carrier sailing in proximity. The ship had to be abandoned, and later towed to dry dock. The reason why the fire broke out is unknown but possibly related to the cargo on board.

On 2 August 2019, K-Line was convicted and fined AUD34.5 million for criminal cartel conduct by the Australian Federal Court. The cartel, which was in place from 1997, had fixed prices for the transport of vehicles into Australia. The other cartel participant, Nippon Yusen Kabushiki Kaisha (NYK), was also convicted and fined in 2017.

=== 2023 ===
Around midnight on 26 July 2023, a fire broke out on the car carrier Fremantle Highway operated by K Line. The ship, which came from the port of Bremerhaven, Germany, was on its way to the Suez Canal and, according to the Dutch Coast Guard, was around 27 kilometres (17 mi) north of the Dutch Wadden Sea island of Ameland at that time. The ship had 3,783 vehicles on board, including 498 electric cars. The cause of the fire is unknown, according to the Dutch Coast Guard; Media reports that an electric car had started the fire.

During the extinguishing work on board, one crew member died and 16 were injured. The Dutch Coast Guard rescued the remaining 22 members of the crew. The extinguishing work was difficult because the bow is 30 metres (98 ft) high. An environmental disaster was feared if the ship would have sunk. After the fire had burned out, Fremantle Highway was towed into Eemshaven, Groningen (Netherlands) on 3 August.

== Fleet ==
K Line fleet consists of about 500 ships, despite by the segments

- Car carriers
- Bulk carrier
- Oil tanker
- Liquid gas tanker
- Thermal coal carrier
- Offshore-service ships
- Container ships (in ONE integrated)

=== Offshore support vessels ===
K Line Offshore AS in Arendal, a subsidiary of K Line for offshore support services of oil and gas fields is operating the following ships:

- KL Arendalfjord - Delivered 24 October 2008
- KL Brevikfjord - Delivered 24 September 2010
- KL Sandefjord - Delivered 7 January 2011
- KL Brisfjord - Delivered 13 January 2011
- KL Brofjord - Delivered 5 April 2011
- KL Saltfjord - Delivered 14 April 2011
- KL Barentsfjord - Delivered 28 June 2011

=== Container ships ===
Container ship classes of K Line
Ship class	Built	Capacity (TEU)	Ships in class	Notes
Hannover Bridge class	2006–2012	8,212-8,970	13	Operated by Ocean Network Express
Millau Bridge class	2015–2018	13,900	10	Operated by Ocean Network Express

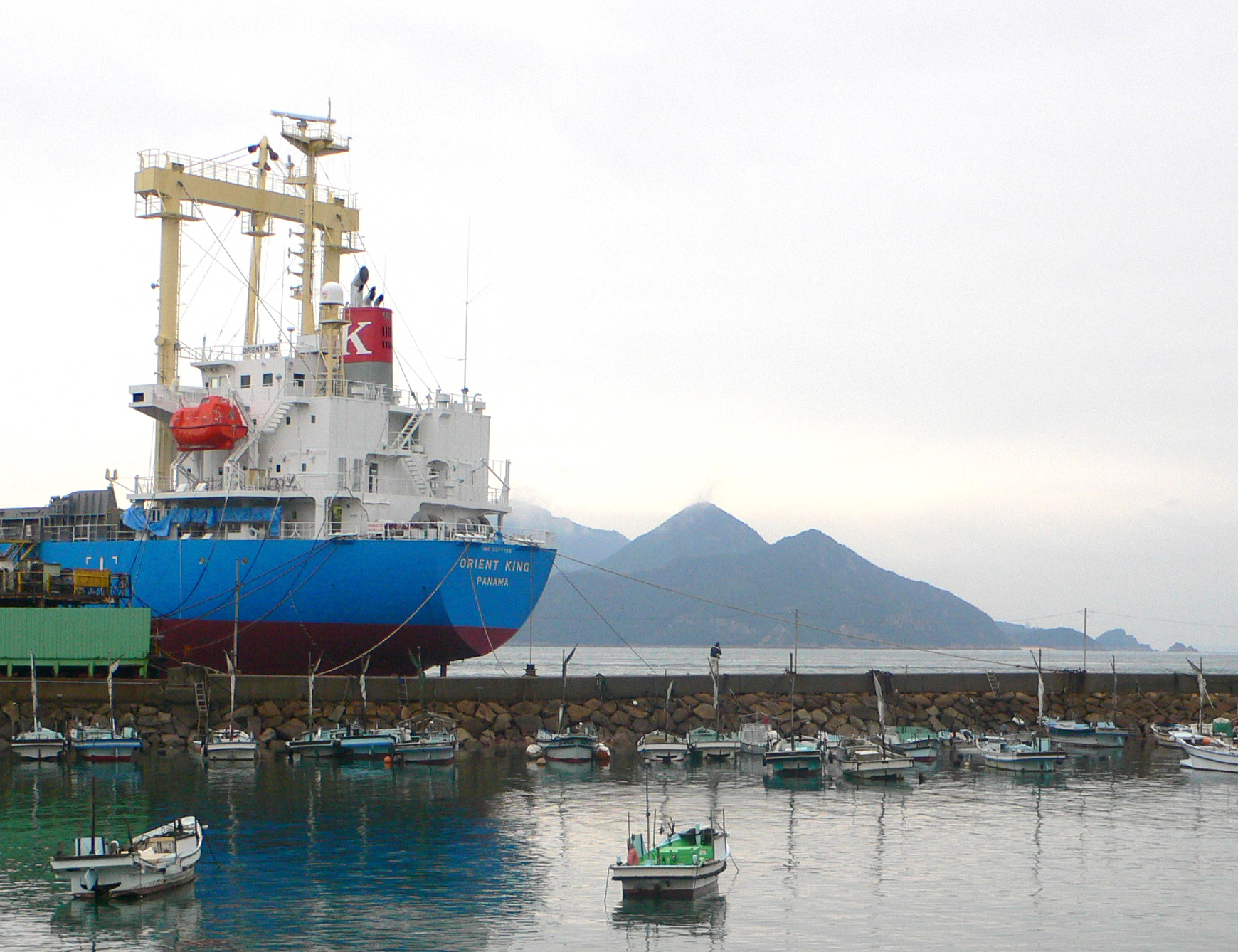
MV Orient King under repair at the shipyard of Imabari, Japan.
