= Long Beach Harbor Patrol =

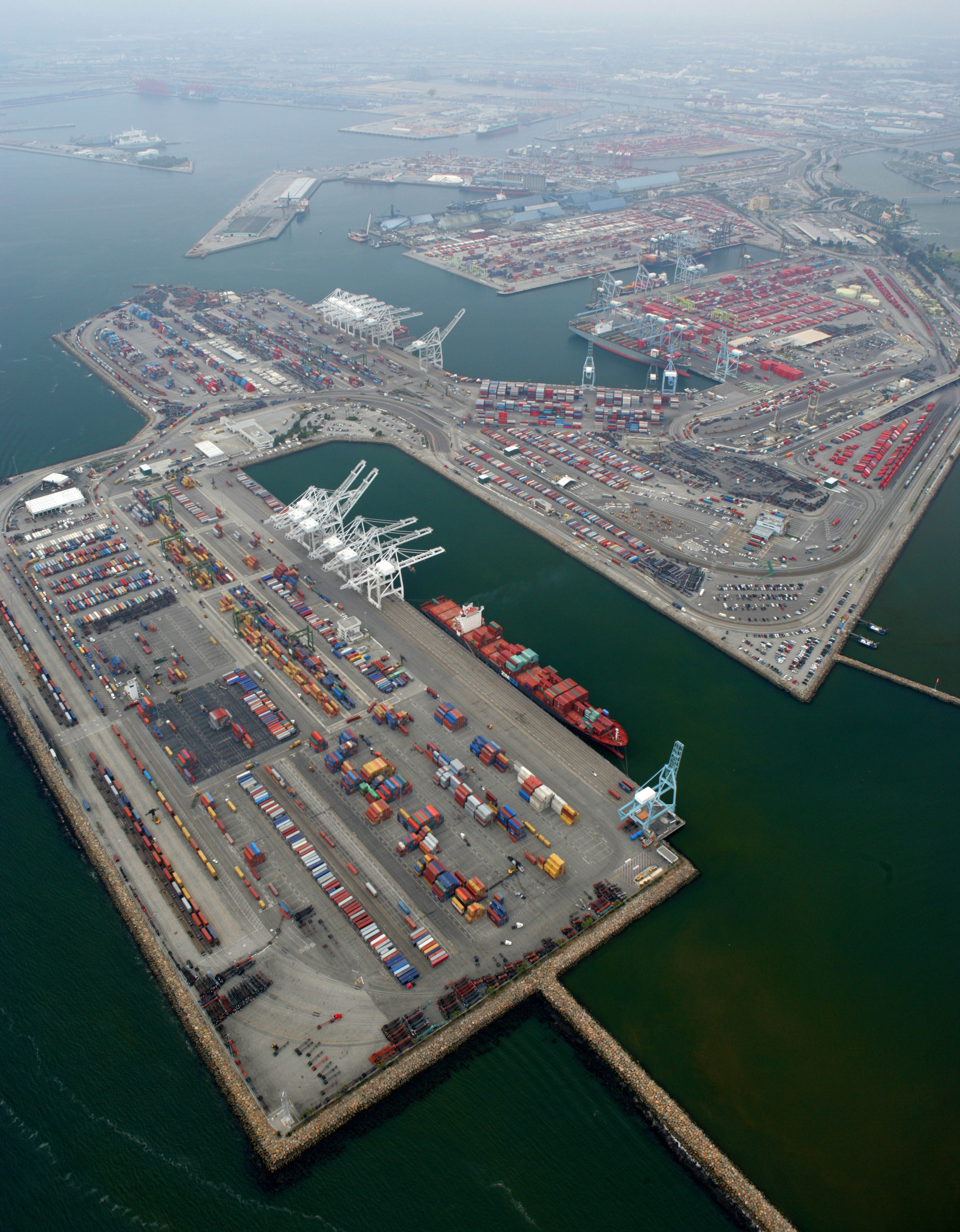
Port of Long Beach, California

The Long Beach Harbor Patrol is an agency within the Port of Long Beach. Its officers are armed public officers responsible for the public safety and physical security of the Port. Appointed as Public Officers under California penal code 836.5 by the City of Long Beach.

Long Beach Police Port division was established on December 17, 2001, following the terrorist attack of September 11, 2001.

== See also ==
- List of law enforcement agencies in California
