= ONE Apus =

Container ship

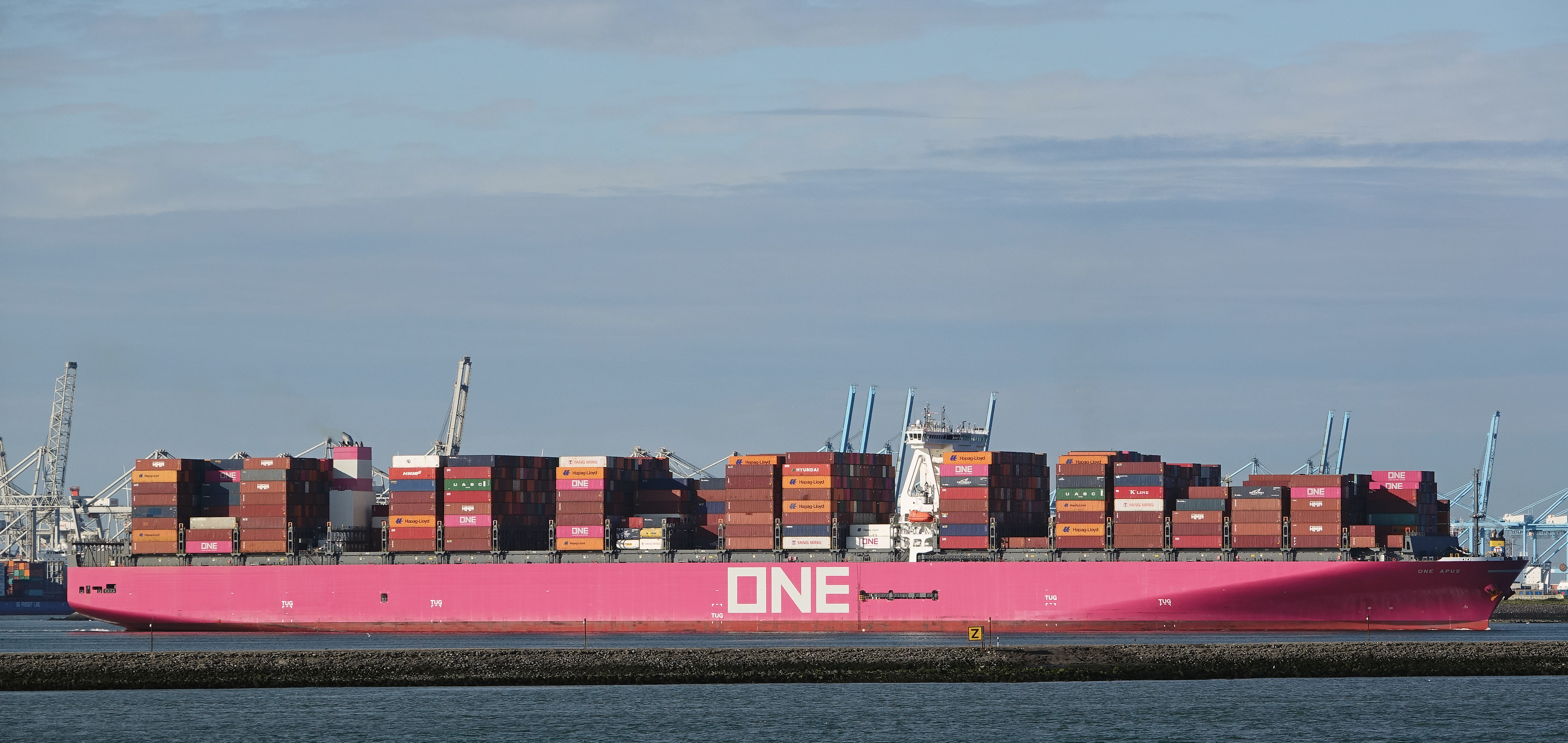
The ONE Apus in 2020

The ONE Apus is a 14,000 TEU container ship. In 2020, it lost approximately 1,816 containers overboard in the Pacific Ocean, the largest loss of containers in transport since 2013.

== Vessel ==
The ONE Apus is a 14,000 TEU container ship built in 2019, measuring 364 meters long. The vessel is one of a series of 15 Bird-class container ships, operated by Japan's Ocean Network Express, sailing under the Japanese flag.

== 2020 Pacific Ocean incident ==
On 30 November 2020 the ONE Apus was sailing from Yantian, Shenzhen, to Long Beach, California, when it encountered severe weather approximately 1,600 nautical miles (3,000 km) north-west of Hawaii. Heavy rolling caused the loss overboard of approximately 1,816 containers including 64 with dangerous goods. The ship arrived at Kobe, Japan, on 8 December, where it offloaded nearly 1000 damaged containers, and resumed its voyage on 16 March 2021. The weather at the time of the accident was reported as Beaufort force 4 with north-westerly seas of 5 to 6 meters and a "long high swell". Weather maps show significant wave heights of up to 16 meters associated with the weather system encountered by the vessel.

The cause of the accident is being investigated. Still, it probably involves a combination of factors, including the weather conditions, the ship's rolling behaviour, and the inherent hazards of eight-high on-deck container stowage. One contributor to the accident could be parametric roll resonance, a hazard known to affect container ships.

The ONE Apus incident was the largest loss of containers in transport since the MOL Comfort sank in 2013. The cargo loss cost is estimated at $90 million. The ship was delayed for approximately three months. The cost of supply chain disruption for US manufacturers and retailers is not yet quantified. Insurance claims could exceed $200 million.
