= LX Pantos =

South Korean logistics company

LX Pantos Co., Ltd.
- Native name: 주식회사 엘엑스판토스
- Romanized name: LX Pantos
- Formerly: Pantos Logistics
- Company type: Subsidiary
- Industry: Logistics
- Founded: 1977; 48 years ago
- Headquarters: Seoul, South Korea
- Parent: LX International
- Website: www.lxpantos.com

LX Pantos Co., Ltd. is a global logistics service provider based in Seoul, South Korea. Since its inception in 1977, LX Pantos has evolved from an air freight agent, to include all logistics services including: sea freight, air freight, road and rail freight, warehousing, logistics consulting, international express, project cargo, terminal service, and customs clearance.

== History ==
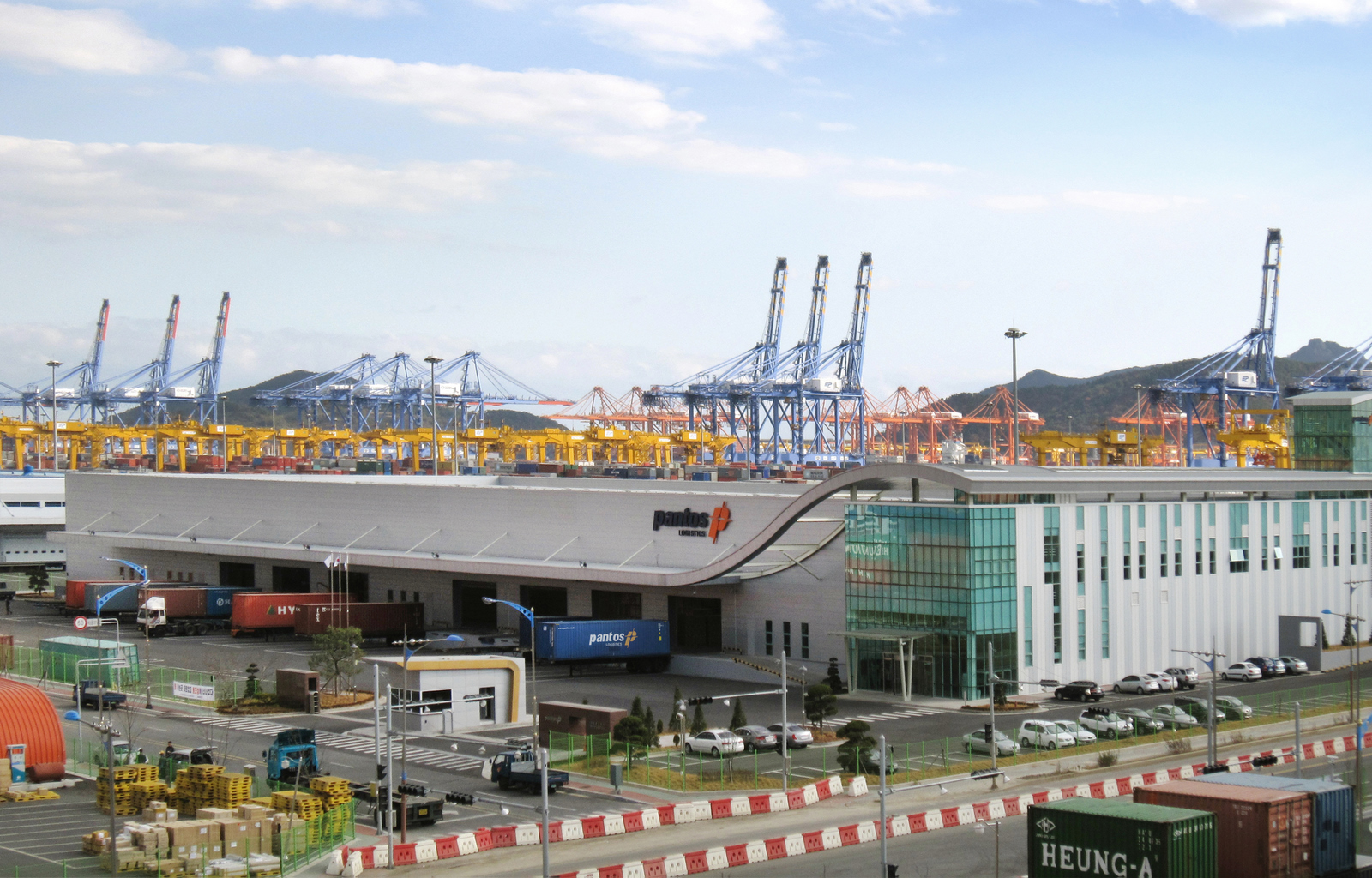
Pantos Logistics' warehouse in Busan New Port (Opened in 2010)

- February 1977: Established Bumhan Huengsan Corporation
- 1992: Changed Company name to Pan Korea Express Co., Ltd
- 2006: Changed Company name to Pantos Logistics Co., Ltd
- 2021: Changed Company name to LX Pantos Co., Ltd

== Operations ==
LX Pantos has roughly 10,000 employees, operating in 40 countries throughout Asia, North and South America, Europe, CIS, the Middle East, and Africa, creating 360 networks. LX Pantos is the largest logistics company in Korea and the 15th largest company in the world, and it is one of the world's top 6 sea freight forwarders by volume.

On 4 February 2025, it has been announced a collaboration with Ocean Network Express for the American market.

== See also ==
- LX Group
- Ocean Network Express
