= Bird-class container ship =

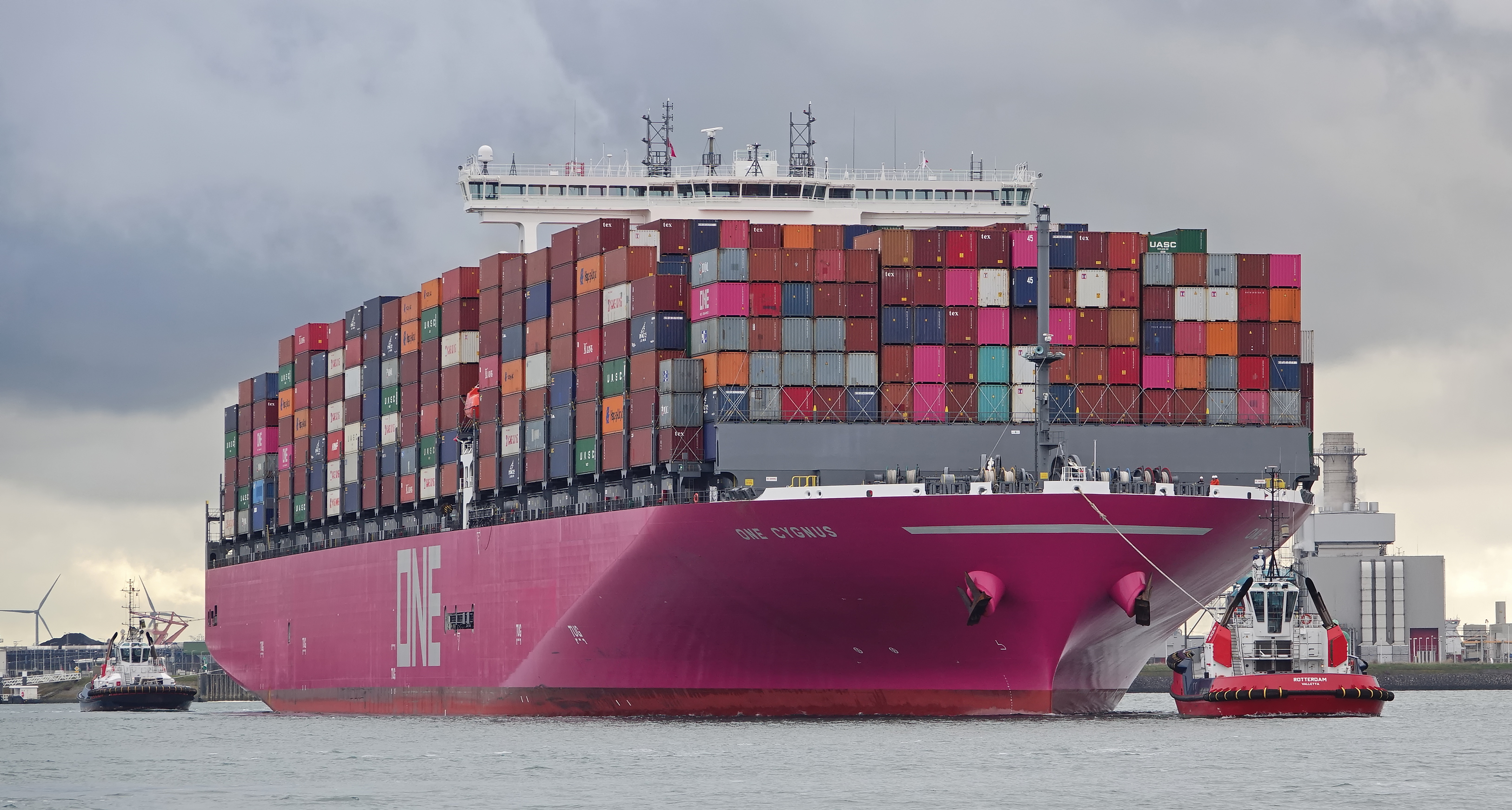
- ONE Cygnus in the port of Rotterdam

Class overview
- Builders: Japan Marine United
- Operators: Ocean Network Express
- In service: 2016-present
- Planned: 15
- Building: 0
- Completed: 15
- Active: 15

General characteristics
- Type: Container ship
- Tonnage: 145,000 GT
- Length: 364.2 m (1,195 ft)
- Beam: 50.6 m (166 ft)
- Draught: 15.8 m (52 ft)
- Capacity: 14,000 TEU

The Bird class is a series of 15 container ships built for NYK Line. The ships have a maximum theoretical capacity of around 14,000 TEU. The ships were built by Japan Marine United at their shipyard in Kure.

== List of ships ==
Ship	Previous names	Yard number	IMO number	Delivery	Status	ref
ONE Blue Jay	NYK Blue Jay (2016-2019)	5061	9741372	22 Feb 2016	In service	
ONE Ibis	NYK Ibis (2016-2019)	5062	9741384	23 May 2016	In service	
ONE Eagle	NYK Eagle (2016-2019)	5063	9741396	02 Sep 2016	In service	
ONE Crane	NYK Crane (2016-2019)	5064	9741401	30 Nov 2016	In service	
ONE Hawk	NYK Hawk (2017-2020)	5075	9741413	31 Mar 2017	In service	
ONE Falcon	NYK Falcon (2017-2020)	5076	9741425	26 Jun 2017	In service	
ONE Swan	NYK Swan (2017-2020)	5077	9741437	22 Sep 2017	In service	
ONE Owl	NYK Owl (2017-2021)	5078	9741449	13 Dec 2017	In service	
ONE Wren	NYK Wren (2018-2021)	5111	9784776	23 Mar 2018	In service	
ONE Stork		5112	9784788	06 Jun 2018	In service	
ONE Aquila		5121	9806043	07 Sep 2018	In service	
ONE Columba		5122	9806055	16 Nov 2018	In service	
ONE Grus		5123	9806067	25 Jan 2019	In service	
ONE Apus		5124	9806079	12 Apr 2019	In service	
ONE Cygnus		5125	9806081	04 Jul 2019	In service	
