= Millau Bridge-class container ship =

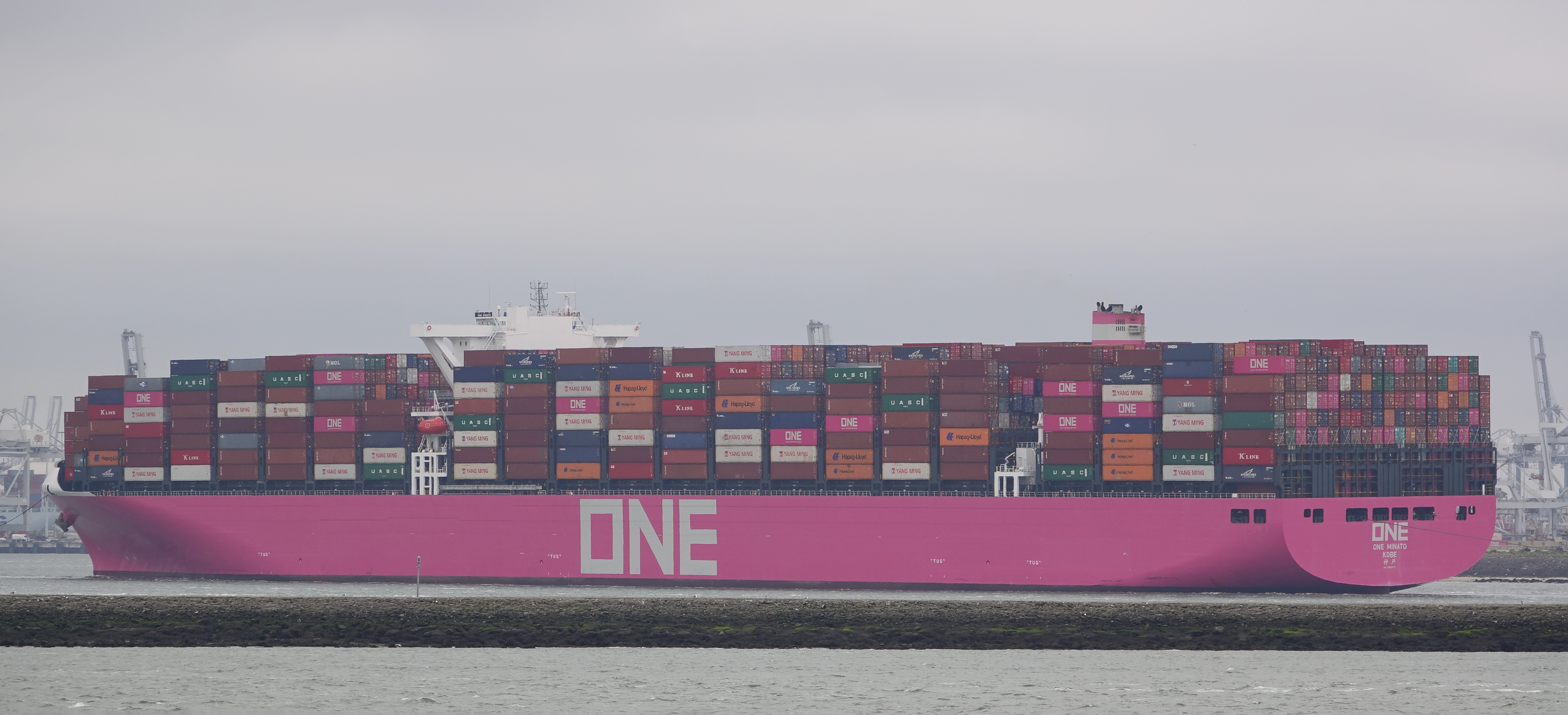
- ONE Minato in the port of Rotterdam

Class overview
- Builders: Imabari Shipbuilding
- Operators: Ocean Network Express
- In service: 2015-present
- Completed: 10
- Active: 10

General characteristics
- Type: Container ship
- Tonnage: 150,709 GT
- Length: 365.94 m (1,201 ft)
- Beam: 51.2 m (168 ft)
- Draught: 15.5 m (51 ft)
- Capacity: 13,900 TEU

The Millau Bridge class is a series of 10 container ships that are now operated by the Japanese shipping company Ocean Network Express (ONE). The ships have a maximum theoretical capacity of 13,900 TEU.

The first ships were ordered by K Line in 2013. In 2014, K line announced it had ordered 5 additional ships that would be delivered in 2018.

== List of ships ==
Ship	Previous names	Yard number	IMO number	Delivery	Status	ref
ONE Millau	Millau Bridge (2015-2020)	2531	9706736	31 Mar 2015	In service	
ONE Manchester	Manchester Bridge (2015-2020)	2532	9706748	19 May 2015	In service	
ONE Munchen	Munchen Bridge (2015-2020)	2533	9706750	13 Jul 2015	In service	
ONE Mackinac	Mackinac Bridge (2015-2020)	2535	9689603	19 Aug 2015	In service	
ONE Manhattan	Manhattan Bridge (2015-2020)	2536	9689615	7 Oct 2015	In service	
ONE Milano	Milano Bridge (2018-2022)	2571	9757187	18 Jan 2018	In service	
ONE Monaco	Monaco Bridge (2018-2023)	2572	9757204	9 Feb 2018	In service	
ONE Madrid	Madrid Bridge (2018-2023)	2573	9805453	13 Apr 2018	In service	
ONE Meishan	Meishan Bridge (2018-2023)	2575	9805465	30 May 2018	In service	
ONE Minato		2576	9805477	18 Jul 2018	In service	
