= International Transportation Service =

- Industry: Container terminal, freight transport
- Founded: 1971
- Headquarters: Long Beach, California, United States
- Website: itslb.com

International Transportation Service, LLC (ITS) is an American Marine container terminal company that deals with the receipt and shipment of containerized cargo in domestic and foreign trade. It also focuses on marine cargo handling, vessel stevedoring, on-dock rail, and staffing services. ITS was founded and owned by K Line until 2020. International Transportation Service serves worldwide.

ITS was founded in 1971 and is located at the Port of Long Beach in Long Beach, California. The Green Port Policy was adopted by ITS in 2006 to reduce pollution in Long Beach and Los Angeles.

ITS clients have included COSCO Container Lines, Hamburg Süd, Hanjin Shipping, Kawasaki Kisen Kaisha, Ltd., Maersk Line, U.S. Lines and Yang Ming Marine Transport Corporation.

== See also ==
- Port of Long Beach
- Port of Los Angeles
- Terminal Island
