= Ocean Network Express =

Japanese container shipping company

Ocean Network Express Holdings, Ltd.

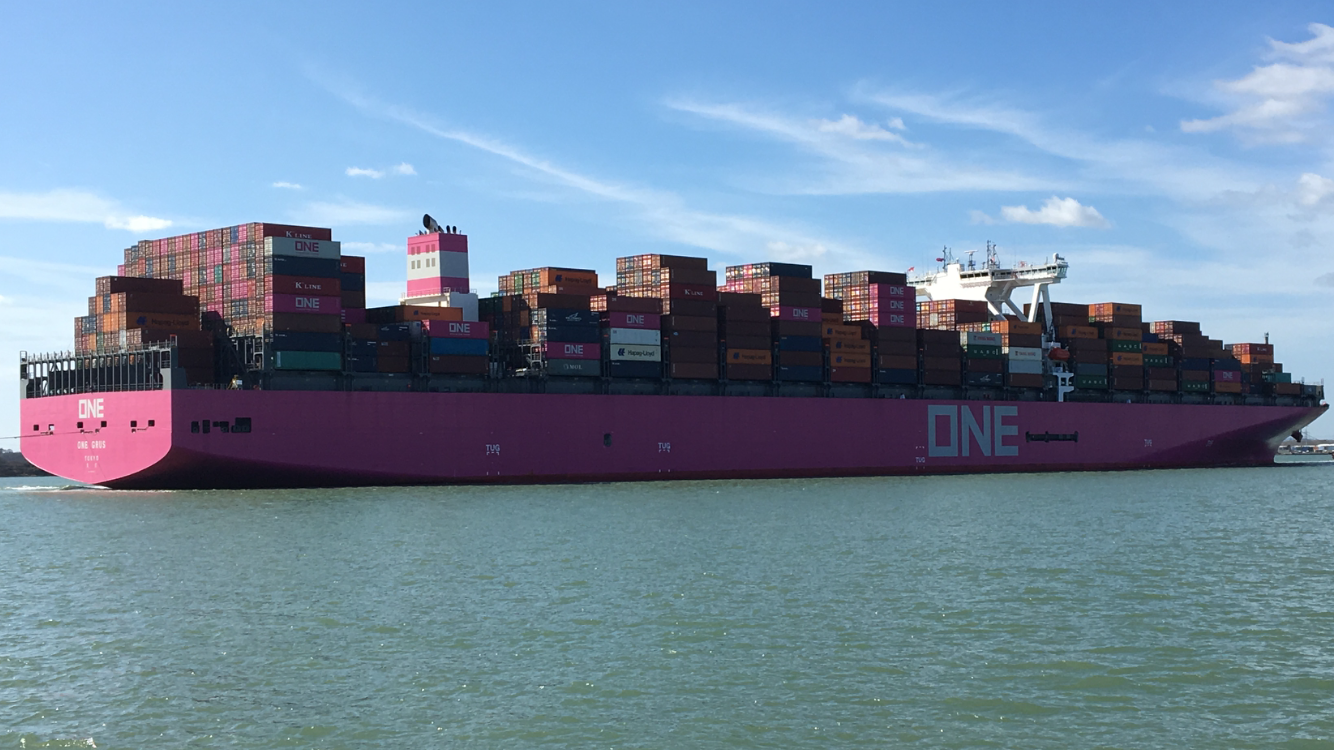
- Type: Joint venture
- Industry: Maritime transport
- Founded: 2017; 9 years ago
- Headquarters: Tokyo and Singapore
- Area served: Worldwide
- Key people: Till Ole Barrelet
- Owner: Nippon Yusen (38%); Mitsui O.S.K. Lines (31%); K Line (31%)
- Number of employees: 14,000
- Subsidiaries: Ocean Network Express Japan (Japan); Ocean Network Express Pte. Ltd. (Singapore)
- Website: one-line.com

Ocean Network Express Holdings, Ltd., branded as ONE, is a Japanese container transportation and shipping company jointly owned by the Japanese shipping Lines Nippon Yusen Kaisha, Mitsui O.S.K. Lines, and K Line. Launched in 2017 as a joint venture, ONE inherited the container shipping operations of its parent companies, corresponding to a combined fleet capacity of about 1.4 million TEU.

== History ==
ONE was founded in 2016 as a joint venture between Nippon Yusen Kaisha (NYK), Mitsui O.S.K. Lines (MOL), and K Line. The company was formed as part of a larger process of consolidation that was occurring in the container shipping industry at that time, affected by poor profits and surplus capacity. It merged the container shipping divisions of the three companies, forming the sixth-largest container shipping company in the world at that time. NYK controls a 38% stake of the joint venture, while MOL and K Line own 31% each.

After starting corporate and sales activities in October 2017, the company began trading in April 2018, with representative headquarters in Japan, business operation headquarters in Singapore and regional headquarters in United Kingdom, United States, Hong Kong, and Brazil, and local offices in 90 countries.

On 2 April 2018, ONE Minato (ordered by K Line, and originally named Minato Bridge) was launched from Imabari Shipbuilding as trial. The vessel has a capacity of 14,000 TEU, and has been re-painted in magenta.

On 15 May 2018, the first magenta painted vessel was delivered and added into the fleet. ONE Commitment (formerly known as MOL Commitment, built in 2013), started her maiden voyage at Singapore and reached Yantian International Container Terminals in China. Sailing under Japanese flag, the vessel operates on THE Alliance PN2 service calling Japan, China, US and Canada with a total capacity of 8,560 TEU.

On 12 June 2018, the newly built ONE Stork was delivered and launched from Hiroshima, Kure Shipyard in Japan. This vessel was originally intended as NYK Stork, as part of the 8 Bird-class container ship sister ships, ordered and owned by Nippon Yusen Kaisha, and chartered to ONE. The ship has a capacity of 14,000 TEUs and is magenta painted. The first deployment was instructed towards North America East Coast, after calling several loading ports in China, Hong Kong and Singapore.

On 7 July 2018, ONE Competence made fast at the Port of Oakland. The vessel was built in 2008 as MOL Competence, to carry over 8000 TEUs. She has recently been repainted in magenta, following the intended plan to rebrand over 240 vessels in the fleet.

In August 2018, ONE ordered more than 14,000 refrigerated containers.

In December 2018, ONE and PSA International signed an agreement to form a joint venture at Pasir Panjang Terminal in Singapore to conduct container operations in the terminal, starting in the first half of 2019.

On 30 November 2020, the container ship ONE Apus lost an estimated 1816 containers overboard during severe weather while traveling from Yantian in China to Long Beach, California, USA. Among these were 64 containers of dangerous goods. Removing collapsed containers from the deck took 3 months after the ship docked in Kobe, Japan.

On 14 April 2021, ONE is added to ISO9001 certification registry of ClassNK.

On 19 April 2021, ONE has announced the formation of a new Green Strategy Department, that will be involved in environmental sustainability projects, such as the successful trial of bio-fuel to power the MOL Experience container ship.

On 4 February 2025, it has been announced a collaboration with LX Pantos for the American market.

On 1 July 2026, Jeremy Nixon, who had headed the company as CEO since July 2017, stepped down and moved to a senior advisory role. He was replaced by Till Ole Barrelet, former chief executive of Emirates Shipping Line.

== Color scheme ==
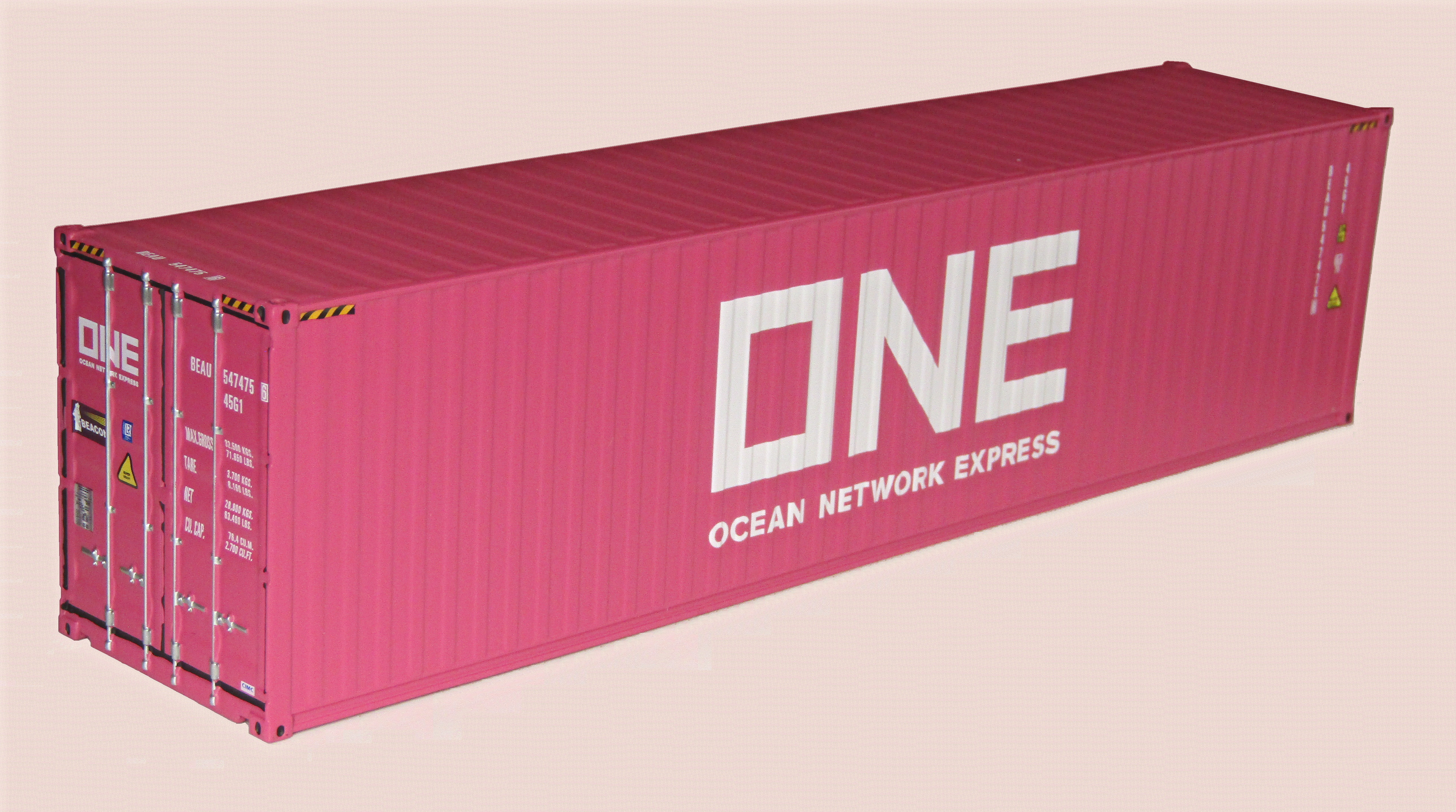
ONE 40 ft container.

ONE decided to paint all its newly launched ships and containers in a recognizable and eye-catching magenta shade (refrigerated containers have the opposite coloring). The magenta colour scheme was inspired by the cherry blossom trees, one of the national symbols of Japan, where the mother companies are located. Other owned ships will also be painted magenta.

== THE Alliance - Premier Alliance ==
Along with Hapag-Lloyd, HMM Co. Ltd., and Yang Ming Marine Transport Corporation, ONE has been a member of THE Alliance. THE Alliance was a group of container shipping companies intended to provide 34 shipping services, directly calling at 81 different ports around the world on a monthly basis. From March 2025, THE Alliance was replaced by Premier Alliance, composed by the same members, excluding Hapag-Lloyd.

== Fleet ==
At establishment, the fleet counted 240 container vessels, including 31 container ships with a capacity of around 14,000 TEU or higher, of which 6 have 20,000 TEU capacity. As a result of the merger, it also inherited container ship orders from its predecessors, with one ultra-large 20,000 TEU vessel and twelve 14,000 TEU vessels due to be delivered (the Millau Bridge-class container ships). A tonnage review was scheduled to happen within 18 months from the operations beginning, in order to be competitive on all services by using the most recent, technological and efficient ships available to be built.

Container ship classes of Ocean Network Express
Ship class	Built	Capacity (TEU)	Ships in class	Notes
NYK Vega-class	2006–2007	9,012	4	NYK Line
Hannover Bridge-class	2006–2009	8,212	8	K Line
NYK Oceanus-class	2007–2008	8,628–9,040	4	NYK Line
MOL Creation-class	2007–2008, 2013–2014	8,110–8,560	10	Mitsui O.S.K. Lines
MOL Maestro-class	2010–2011	6,724	10	Mitsui O.S.K. Lines
NYK Adonis-class	2010–2011	9,592	3	NYK Line
MOL Globe-class	2011–2012	5,605	10	Mitsui O.S.K. Lines. Long-term charter from Bernhard Schulte.
MOL Bravo-class	2014–2016	10,100	10	Mitsui O.S.K. Lines. Long-term charter from Seaspan Corporation.
Millau Bridge-class	2015–2018	13,900	10	K Line
NYK Bird-class	2016–2019	14,000	15	NYK Line
MOL Triumph-class	2017–2018	20,170–20,182	6	Mitsui O.S.K. Lines MOL Triumph was the world’s largest container ship when it was delivered in March 2017.
Zenith Lumos-class	2020–2021	14,952	4	Long-term charter from Zodiac Maritime.
ONE Freedom-class	2022–2024	15,200	7	To be built by Jiangsu New Yangzi Shipbuilding.
ONE Readiness-Class	2023–2024	7,000	10	To be built by Shanghai Waigaoqiao Shipbuilding.
ONE Innovation-class	2023–2024	24,000	6	To be built by Imabari Shipbuilding and Japan Marine United.
ONE Sparkle class	2025–2026	13,700	20	To be built by Nihon Shipyard and Hyundai Heavy Industries
TBD	2026–2027	13,000	22	To be built by Jiangnan Shipyard and Yangzijiang Shipbuilding.
TBD	2028–2029	15,900	8	To be built by HD Korea Shipbuilding.
TBD	2029	15,000	6	To be built by HD Hyundai Heavy Industries.

== See also ==
- List of largest container shipping companies
