= Port of Long Beach =

Container port near Los Angeles, California

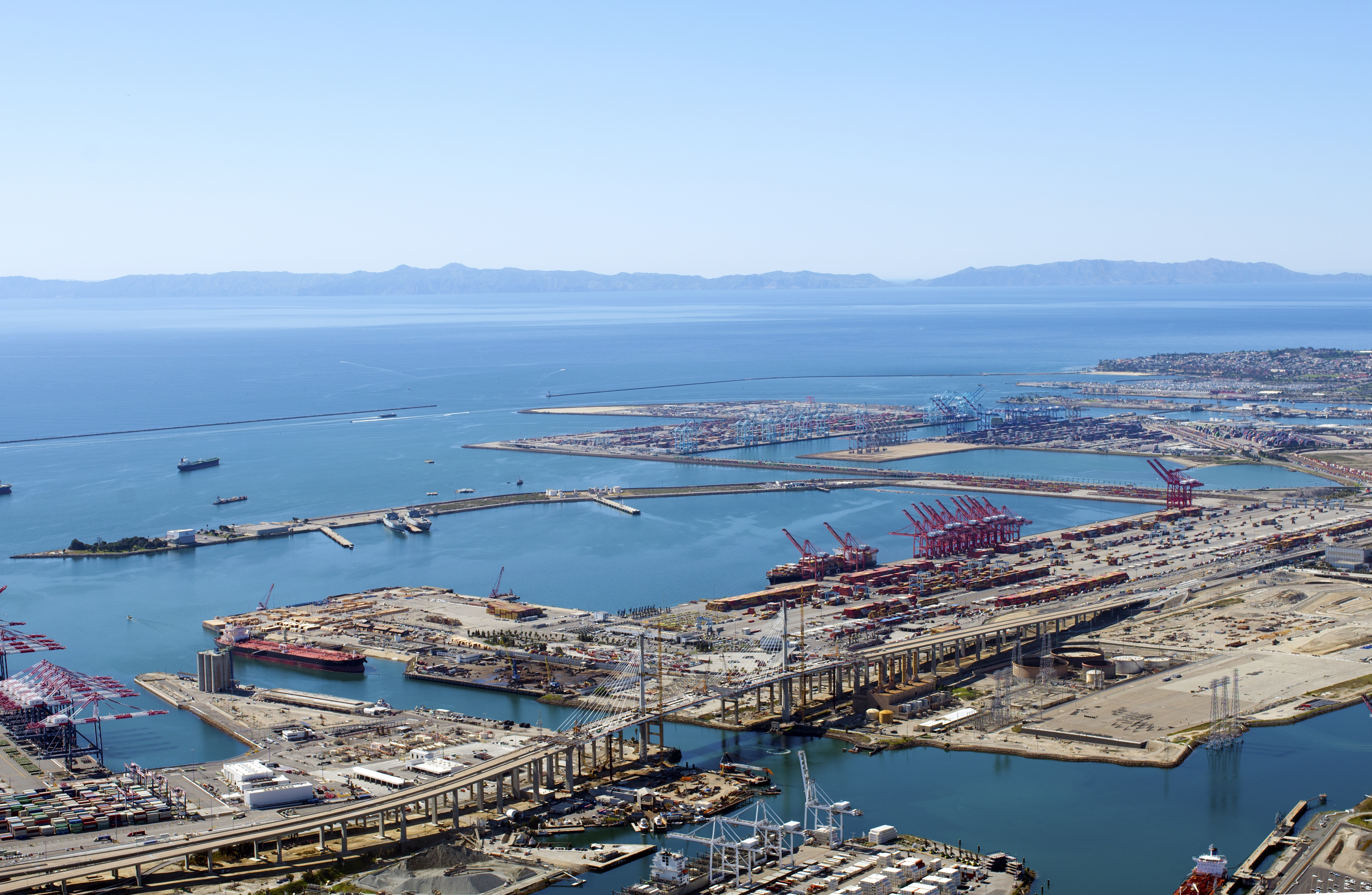
- Part of the Port of Long Beach
- Interactive map of Port of Long Beach

Location
- Country: United States
- Location: Long Beach, California
- Coordinates: 33°45′18″N 118°12′54″W
- UN/LOCODE: US LGB

Details
- Opened: June 24, 1911; 115 years ago
- Size of harbour: 4,600 acres (19 km^{2})
- Land area: 3,520 acres (14.2 km^{2})
- Size: 11.9 mi^{2} (31 km^{2})
- No. of berths: 80
- No. of piers: 12
- Draft depth: >50 ft (15 m)
- CEO: Dr. Noel Hacegaba
- Commissioners: Frank Colonna; Bonnie Lowenthal; Steven Neal; Bobby Olvera Jr.; Sharon Weissman

Statistics
- Vessel arrivals: 2,000 (2024)
- Annual cargo tonnage: ▲200 million metric revenue tons (2024)
- Annual container volume: ▲9.7 million twenty-foot equivalent units (TEU) (2024)
- Value of cargo: US$300 billion (2024)
- Website polb.com

The Port of Long Beach, administered as the Harbor Department of the City of Long Beach, is a container port in the United States, which adjoins Port of Los Angeles. Acting as a major gateway for US–Asian trade, the port occupies 3,200 acres (13 km^{2}) of land with 25 miles (40 km) of waterfront in the city of Long Beach, California. The Port of Long Beach is located less than 2 miles (3.2 km) southwest of Downtown Long Beach and approximately 25 miles (40 km) south of Downtown Los Angeles. The seaport generates approximately US$100 billion per year in trade and employs more than 316,000 people in Southern California. In 2022, the port, together with the adjoining Port of Los Angeles, were considered amongst the world's least efficient ports by the World Bank and IHS Markit citing union protectionism and a lack of automation.

== History ==
=== Early history (1911–1960s) ===
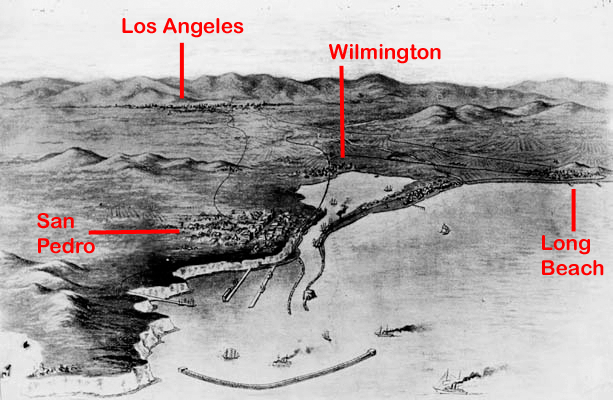
San Pedro Bay in a 1900 plan for the Los Angeles Harbor, present cities and districts (Wilmington and San Pedro used to be independent cities) are named

The San Pedro Breakwater was started in 1899 and over time was expanded to protect the current site of the Port of Long Beach. The Port of Long Beach was founded on 800 acres (3.2 km^{2}) of mudflats on June 24, 1911, at the mouth of the Los Angeles River. In 1917, the first Board of Harbor Commissioners was formed to supervise harbor operations. Due to the booming economy, Long Beach voters approved a $5 million bond to improve the inner and outer harbor in 1924.

The old Municipal Pier was rebuilt into the Municipal Wharf in 1925. In 1925 construction started on Pier A and Pier B, with opening of Pier A in 1930.

By 1926 more than one million tons of cargo were handled, and additional piers were constructed to accommodate the growing business.

In 1921, oil was discovered at the Long Beach Oil Field on and around Signal Hill. In 1932, the fourth-largest oil field in the United States, Wilmington Oil Field, was discovered; much of this field was underneath Long Beach and the harbor area itself. The hundreds of oil wells from Wilmington Oil Field provided oil revenues to the City and Port of Long Beach. The first offshore oil well in the harbor was brought online in 1937, shortly after the discovery that the oil field far extended into the harbor. In the mid-1930s, the port was expanded, largely due to the need to transport oil to foreign markets, as the immense output of oil from the Los Angeles Basin caused a glut in US markets.

The extraction of hundreds of millions of barrels of oil caused concern for subsidence, as the overlying land collapsed into the empty space over time. Engineers and geologists were promptly assigned to the problem, building dikes for flood control at high tide.

On July 3, 1930 the federal River and Harbor Act authorizes expanding the San Pedro Bay breakwater by 3.5-mile (5.6 km) completed in 1949.

In 1930 Procter & Gamble opened a manufacturing plant on the peninsula now known as Pier C. The plant closed in 1988.

Long Beach became a home port for the United States Navy's Pacific Fleet in 1932. In 1940 the navy purchased 105 acres (42 ha) on Terminal Island built the Long Beach Naval Shipyard there.

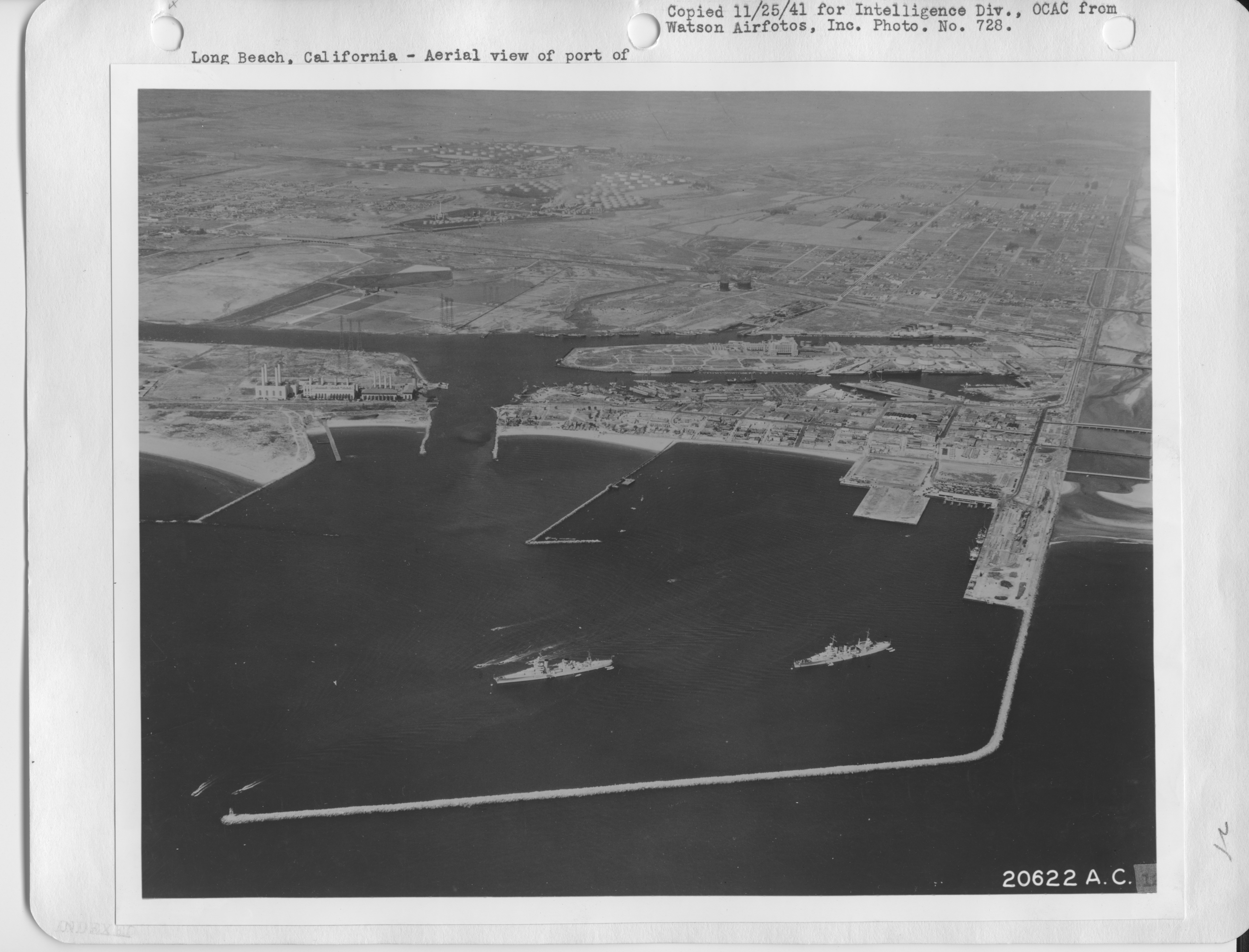
The Port and Back Channel, prior to the construction of the pontoon bridge, circa 1941

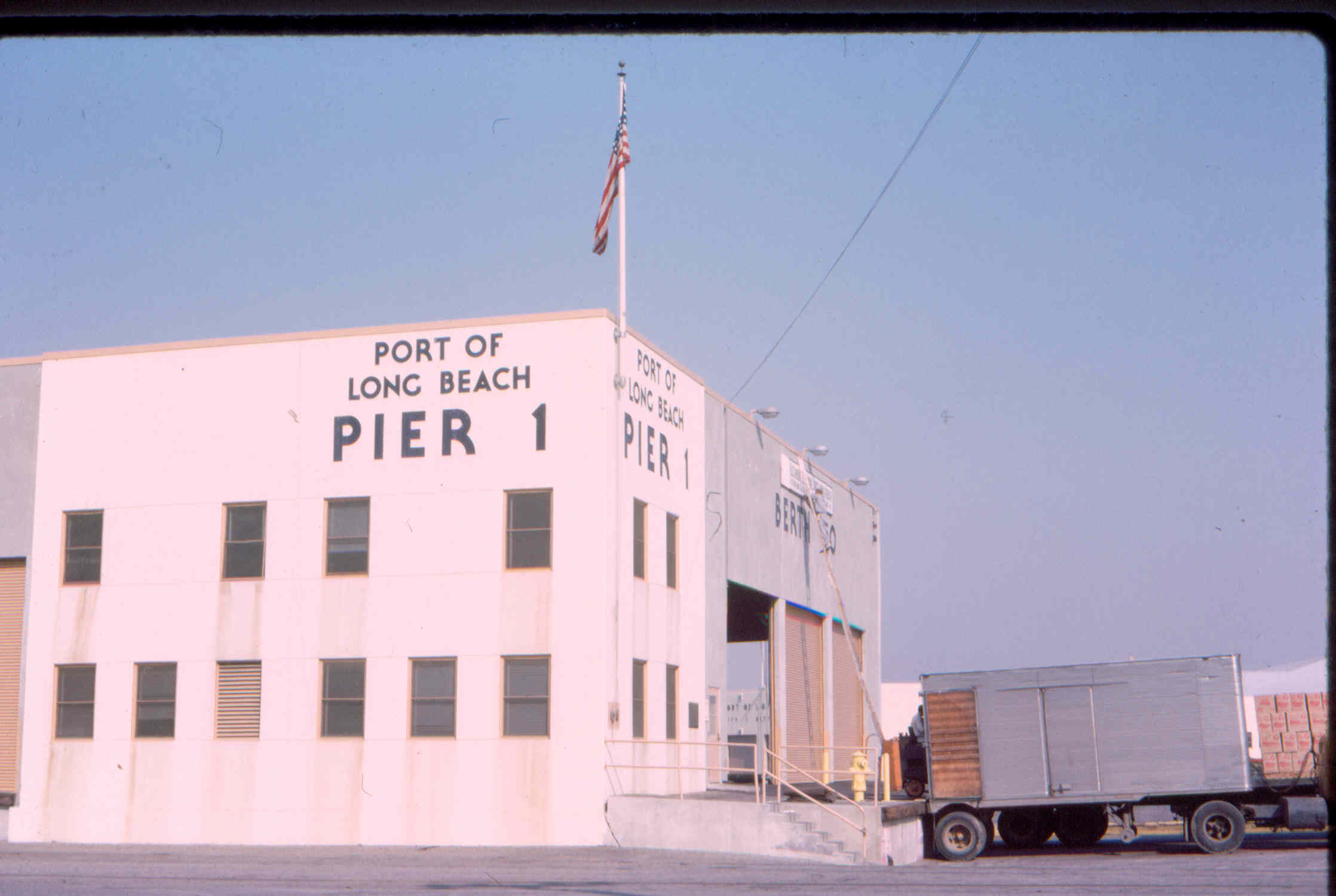
Pier 1, 1963

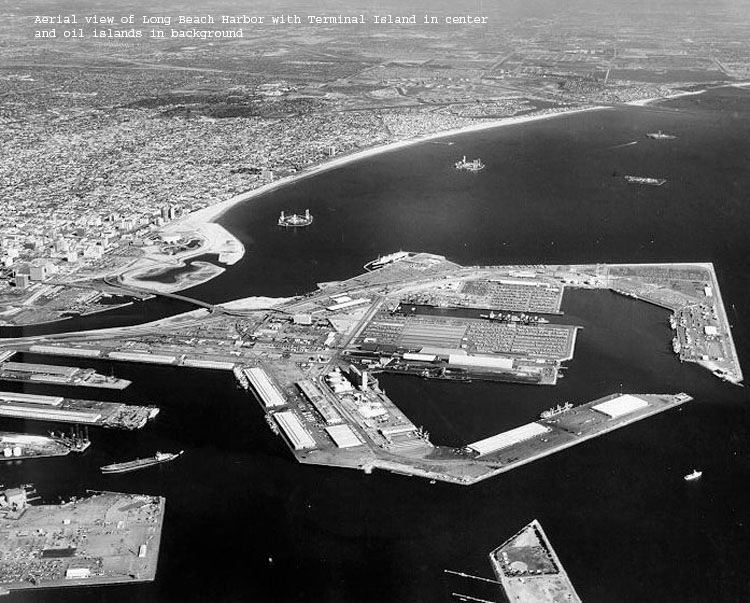
Piers F and J and the THUMS Islands, circa 1967-1971. The RMS Queen Mary is shown moored.

Federal Correctional Institution, Terminal Island, is a low-security prison opened in 1938.

The first bridge linking the eastern end of Terminal Island and Long Beach across the Back Channel was an unnamed "temporary" pontoon bridge constructed during World War II to accommodate traffic resulting from the expansion of the Long Beach Naval Shipyard. In 1968, it was replaced by the Gerald Desmond Bridge.

In 1946, after World War II, the Port of Long Beach was established as "America’s most modern port" with the completion of the first of nine clear-span transit sheds. Pier E was completed and Pier B was expanded to two times its size in 1949. Pierpoint Landing completed on Pier F in 1948, becoming a large sport fishing spot.

Concerns regarding subsidence increased until Operation "Big Squirt," a water injection program, halted any progression of sinking land in 1960.

=== Recent history (1970s–present) ===
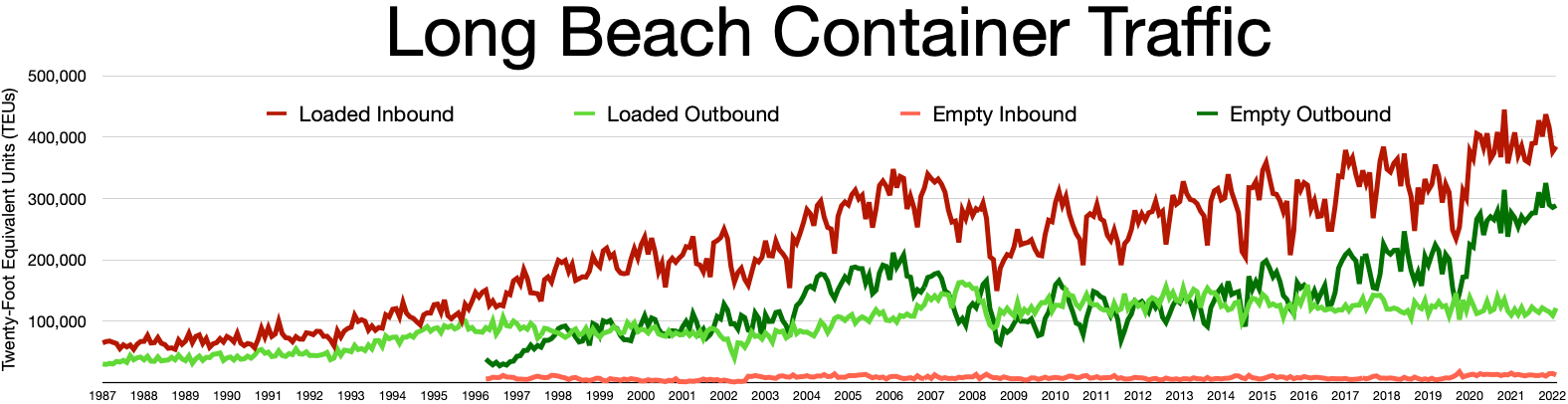
Port of Long Beach traffic Loaded Imports Empty Exports Loaded Exports Empty Imports

In 1971 Pier J expansion is complete with a 55-acre container and car import terminal, becoming Toyota's Western distribution center. In 1972 International Transportation Service completes a 52-acre container terminal on Pier J with a 1,200-foot wharf and two gantry cranes. Maersk Line Pacific completes on Pier G a 29-acre (12 ha) container terminal. Port of Long Beach is the largest container terminal in America.

With the rapid expansion of the port, pollution also increased. The Port of Long Beach instituted programs to prevent and control oil spills, contain debris, and manage vessel traffic. Due to its efforts, the port was awarded the American Association of Port Authorities Environmental "E" Award. Long Beach is the first harbor in the Western Hemisphere to receive such an award.

In 1979, with improved relations between the United States and China, the port sent officials to the People’s Republic of China for the first time. Less than a year later, the China Ocean Shipping Co. (COSCO) inaugurated international shipping and designated Long Beach as its first US port of call. Relationships were forged with other international powers, and South Korea's Hanjin Shipping opened a 57-acre (230,000 m^{2}) container terminal on Pier C of the port in 1991. Following this, COSCO, secured business with the Port of Long Beach in 1997.

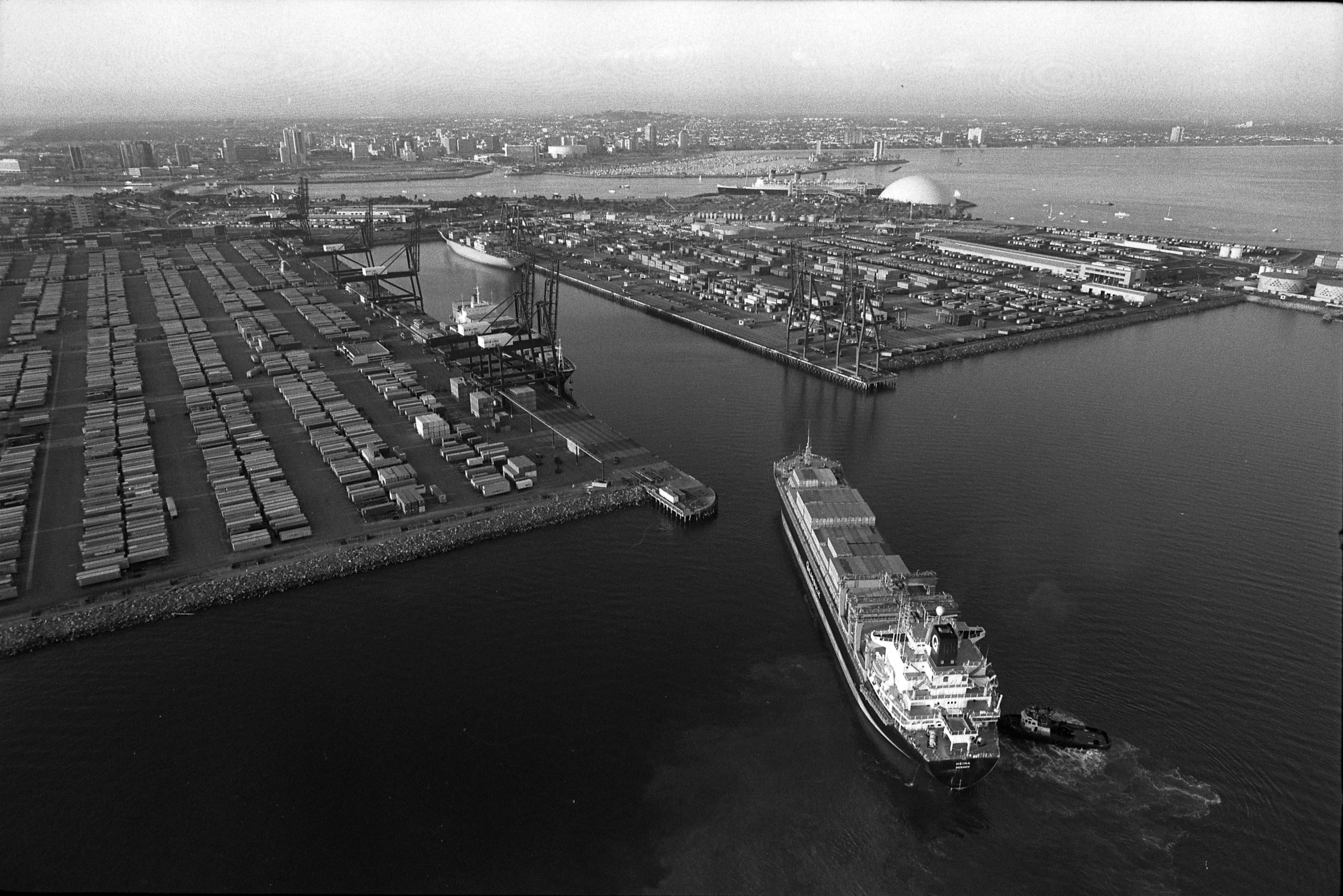
Port of Long Beach, 1984

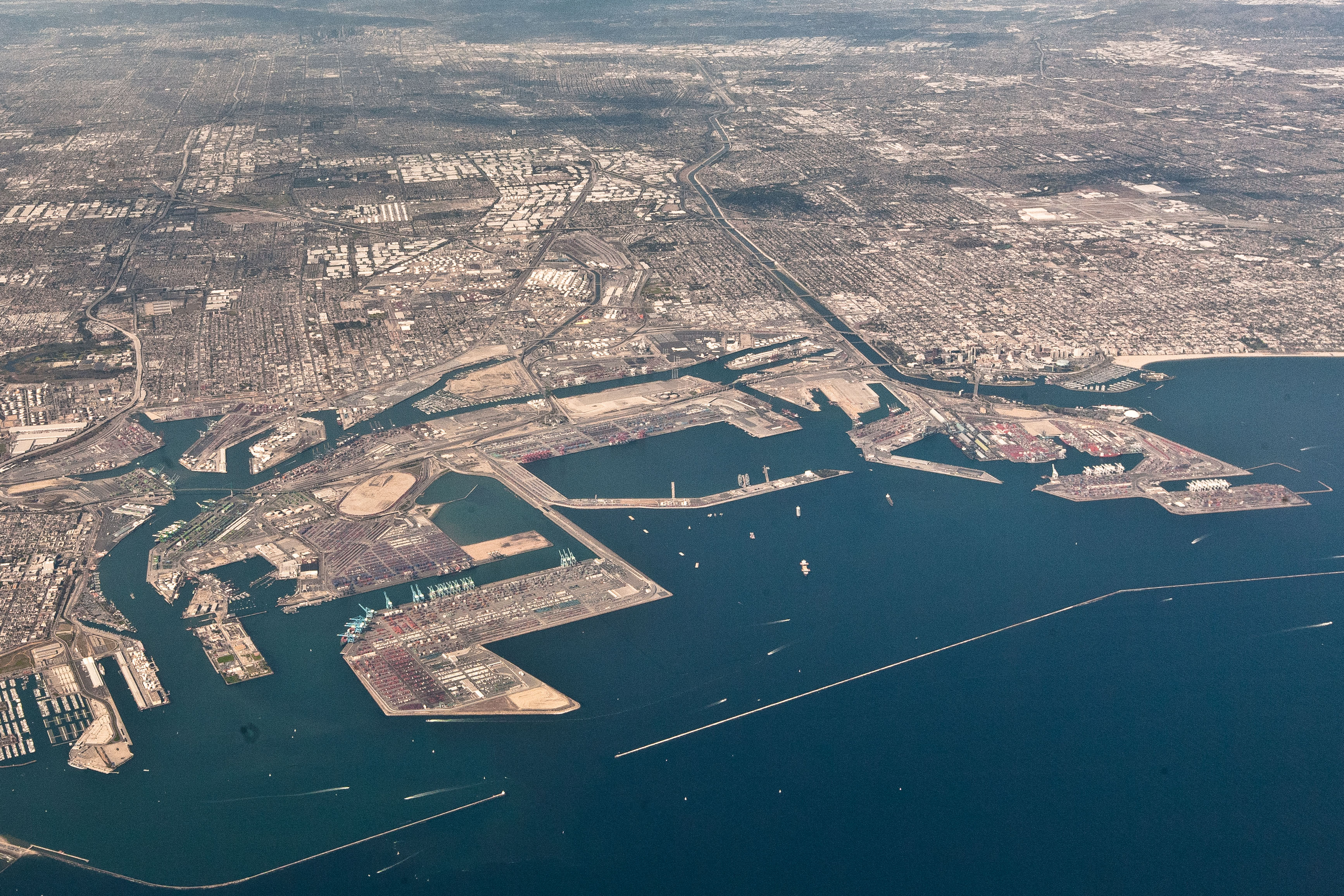
Aerial view of the Port of Long Beach.

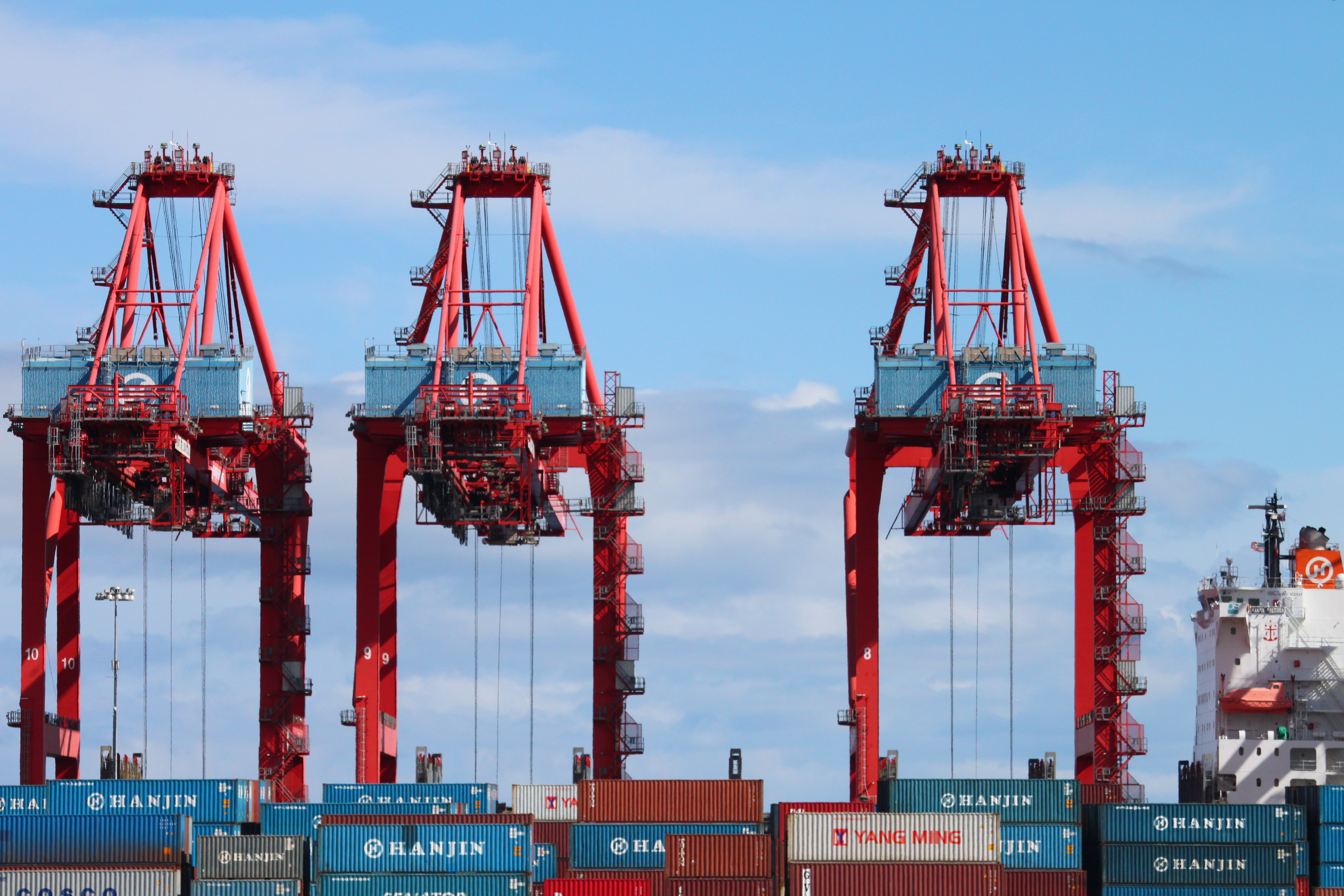
The Total Terminals International Terminal at the Port of Long Beach.

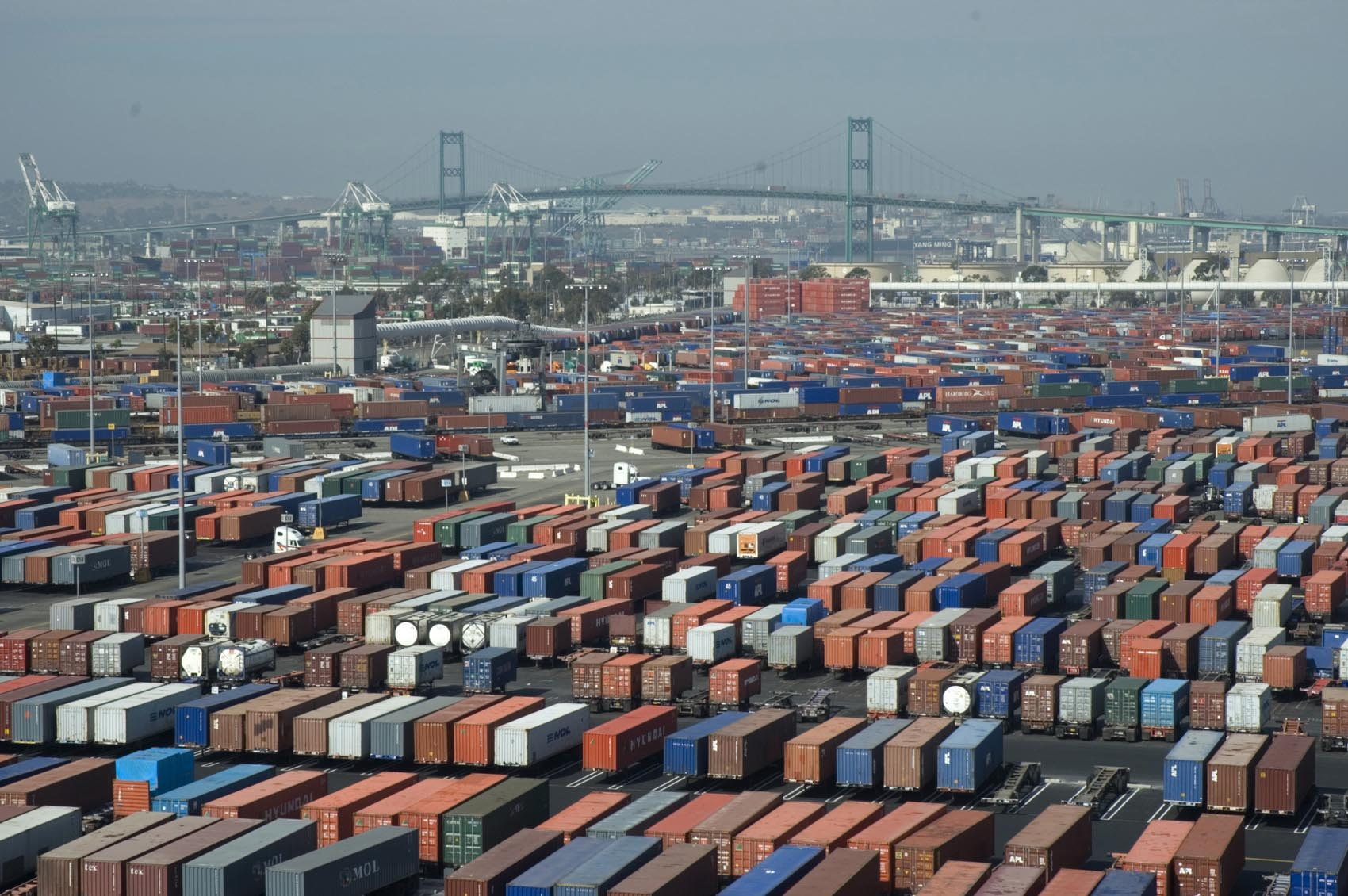
Port of Long Beach, Container terminal, with the Vincent Thomas Bridge in the background

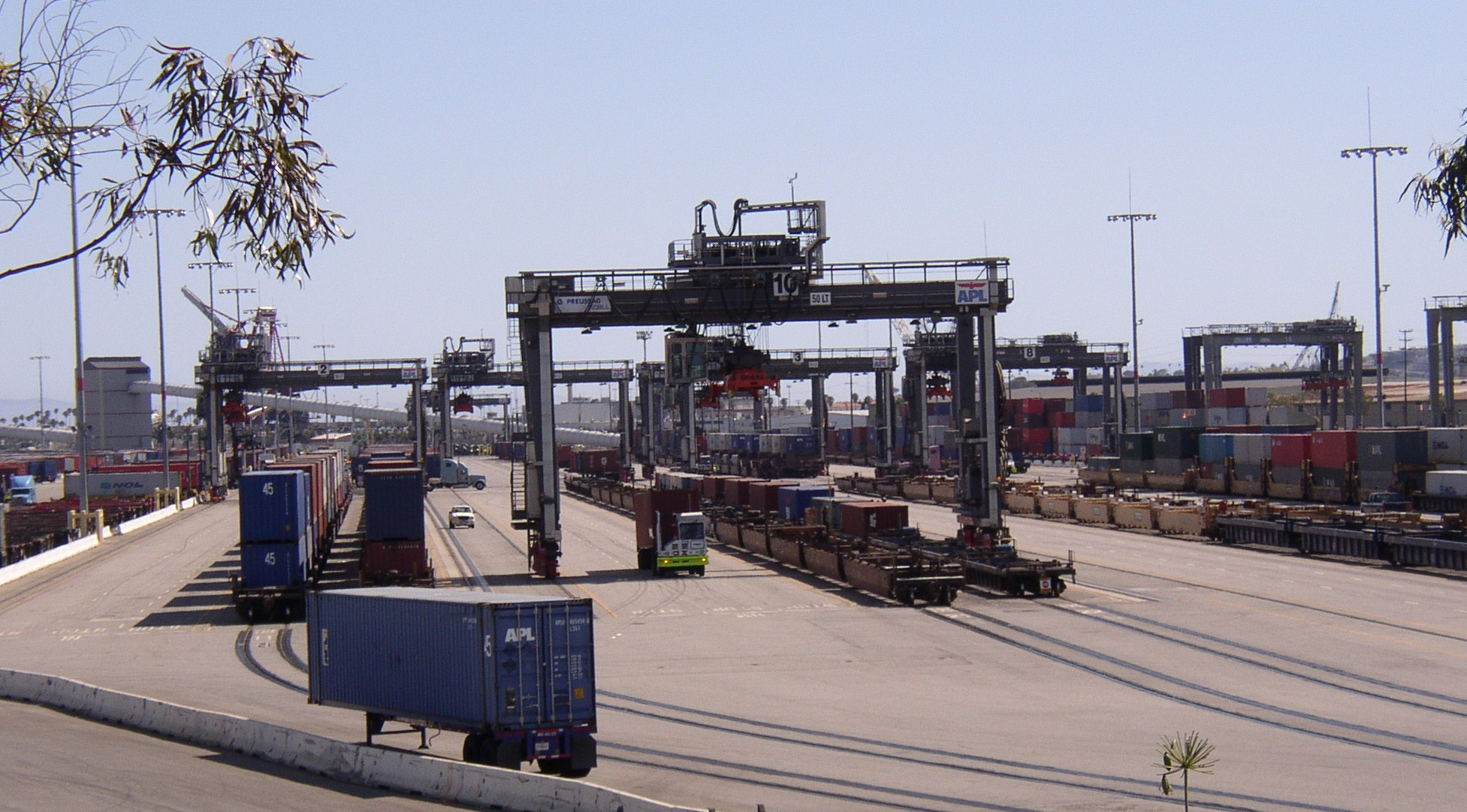
Intermodal freight transport ship-to-rail transfer of containerized cargos at the Port of Long Beach

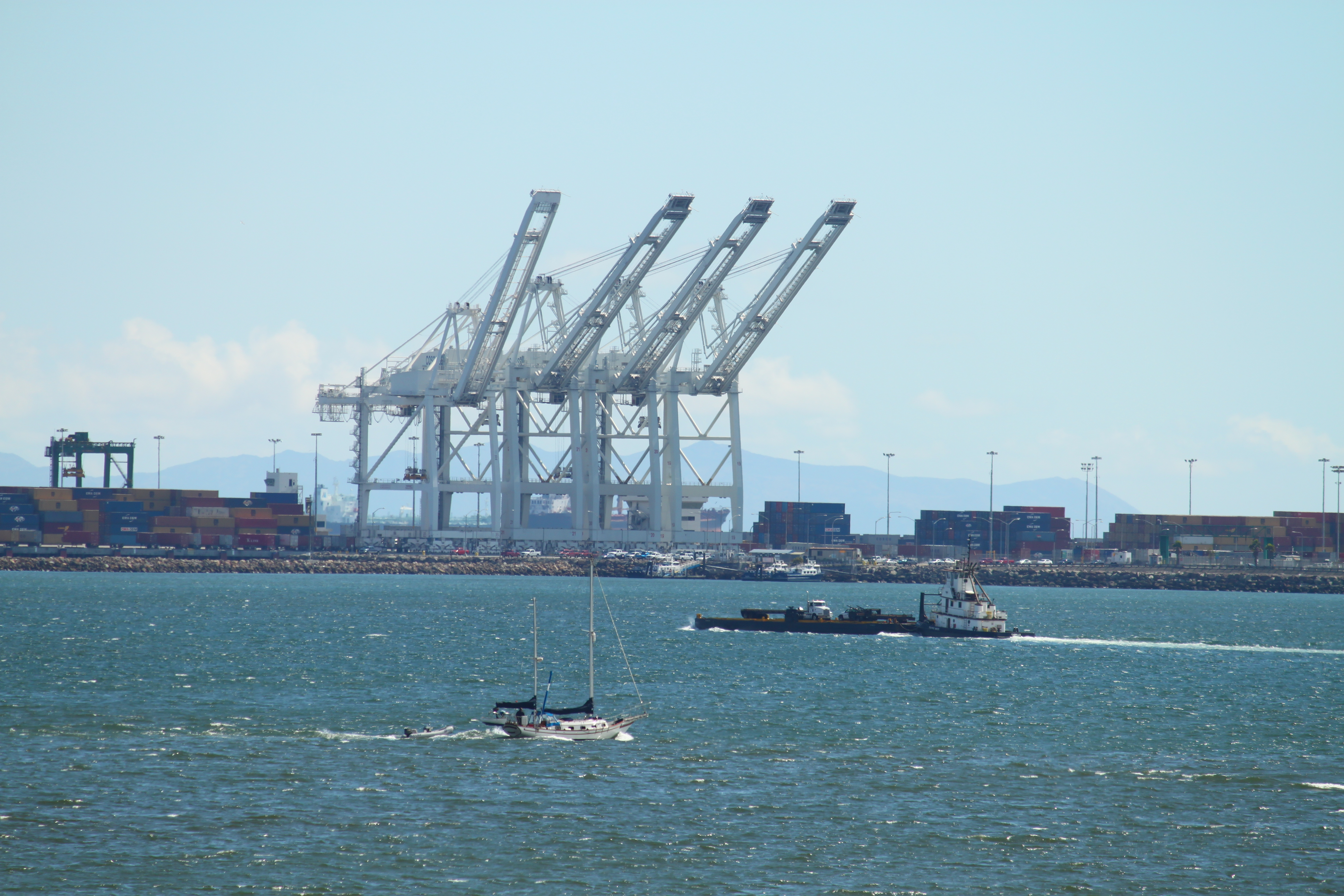
A south looking view of the Port of Long Beach with Santa Catalina Island in the background.

From the late 1990s through 2011, the Port of Long Beach saw increased traffic and growth with the leasing of terminals. In 1997, approximately one million containers were inbound to the port. By 2005, this number had tripled to nearly 3.3 million containers. If outbound containers are included, then the number increased from 3 million containers in 1997 to nearly 6.7 million containers in 2005.

In 2001 U.S. Navy closed its footprint at Port of Long Beach, the Navy transfers it last lot of land on Terminal Island to the Port of Long Beach. The shipyard was closed in 1997.

The surge in vessel traffic and cargo prompted increased environmental efforts by the port. In 2004, the Port of Long Beach reached compliance with an air pollution mandate by handling petroleum coke, one of the port's largest exports, in improved ways. By using enclosed conveyors and covered storage areas, the port reduced the amount of dust emitted by the petroleum coke by 5%, down 21% in 1997.

In 2007, the seaport banned older diesel trucks from serving the port. On October 1, 2011, the Clean Trucks Program was launched by the Ports of Long Beach and Los Angeles. The program set a goal to reduce air pollution from its truck fleet by 80% by 2012. Trucks built prior to 1987 that fail to meet the 2007 clean truck standards set forth by the United States Environmental Protection Agency are denied access to port terminals. In compliance with the clean truck initiative on October 1, all trucking companies conducting business with the port must have a port-approved concession outlining the regulations they must abide by. By September 23, 2011, nearly 500 trucking companies had applied for concessions, amounting to more than 6,000 trucks.

In 2012 International Longshore and Warehouse Union went on strike, that closed down the ports of and Long Beach and Los Angeles. The eight-day strike cost California about $8 billion. Ships were backed up into the Pacific Ocean. The Federal Mediation and Conciliation Service helped end the strike. The strike impacted retailers getting ready for the holiday sales.

In April 2019, COSCO Shipping-owned Orient Overseas (International) Limited announced that it would sell their Long Beach Container Terminal business to a consortium led by Macquarie Infrastructure Partners for $1.78 billion. The federal government demanded the sale of the terminal after a 2018 review by the Committee on Foreign Investment in the United States.

A US$17.1 million contract for 38 battery electric terminal tractors was awarded in April 2019 by SSA Marine, the company that manages operations at the Ports of Long Beach and Oakland; the tractors would be assembled by DINA S.A. using drivetrain components from Meritor and TransPower. That July, SSA Marine awarded a contract for automated chargers using SAE J3105-3 to Stäubli and Tritium. Delivery and installation of the tractors and chargers was completed by December 2023.

A decision in 2020 by the California Public Utilities Commission allowed building a fuel cell plant at the port to move ahead. The joint venture by Toyota and FuelCell Energy would produce power and hydrogen from natural gas.

In 2021, the port had issues processing container ships. 86 container ships had to wait outside the port. > In 2022, the port, together with the adjoining Port of Los Angeles, were considered amongst the world's least efficient ports by the World Bank and IHS Markit citing union protectionism and a lack of automation.

Pier Wind, which would be used for the assembly of offshore wind turbines, was announced in 2023. A 400-acre terminal area (160 ha) would be built on new land composed of dredged material for assembling the tall structures. The turbine systems would be floated into an adjacent wet storage area before being towed out to sea.

== Economy ==
The port's combined import and export value is nearly $100 billion per year. The seaport provides jobs, generates tax revenue, and supports retail and manufacturing businesses. More than $800 million a year is spent on wholesale distribution services in the city. In the City of Los Angeles, port operations generate more than 230,000 jobs, with more than $10 billion a year going to distribution services in the city. On the state level, the Port of Long Beach provides about 370,000 jobs and generates close to $5.6 billion a year in state and local tax revenues

The port is served by the Alameda Corridor through which intermodal railroad cars go north to Los Angeles. With 28 percent of the containers leaving the port going by rail in 2024, the port is building new rails to increase that share to at least 38 percent when completed in 2032.

== Environment ==
The twin ports of Los Angeles and Long Beach are, together, the single largest source of air pollution in the metropolitan Los Angeles area. Both ports have implemented a number of environmental programs to reduce pollution levels while continuing port growth.

=== Green Port Policy ===
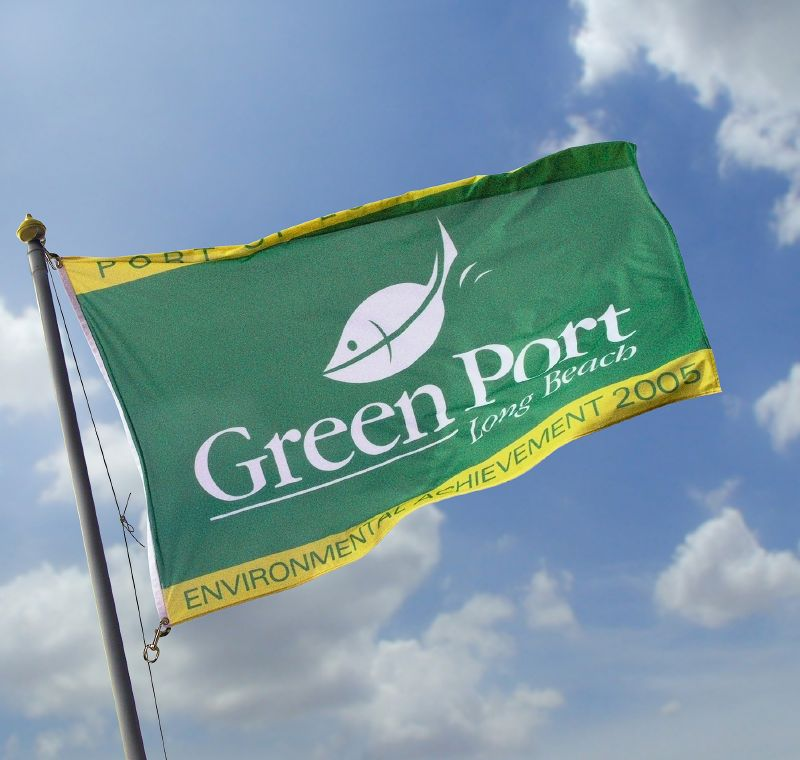
The Green Port Policy was adopted by the Port of Long Beach in 2005.

The internationally recognized Green Port Policy was adopted by the Port of Long Beach in 2005 in an effort to reduce pollution in the growing region of Los Angeles/Long Beach. The policy sets a framework for enhancing wildlife habitat, improving air and water quality, cleaning soil and undersea sediments, and creating a sustainable port culture. Long Beach Harbor is recognized for protection by the California Bays and Estuaries Policy.

=== Clean Air Action Plan ===
In 2007, the Port of Long Beach continued its environmental efforts by implementing the Clean Air Action Plan, an air quality program adopted by the Ports of Long Beach and Los Angeles. In recognition, the Clean Air Action Plan was given the most prestigious award from the American Association of Port Authorities, the Environmental Management Award, in 2007.

The Clean Air Action Plan also included the use of trucks that were deemed excessively pollutant. The port's Harbor Commission approved a Clean Trucks Program that banned old diesel trucks by October 2008. The program, outlined in the San Pedro Bay Ports Clean Air Action Plan, was expected to modernize the port trucking industry and slash truck-related air pollution by 80% by 2012. Diesel-powered harbor short-haul (drayage) trucks are a major source of air pollution.

=== Community grants program ===
The Community Grants Program was created in 2016 to award grants to projects that improve air quality and energy efficiency at facilities used by the public. Established by the Long Beach Board of Harbor Commissioners, it is the largest voluntary effort of its kind in the nation.

=== Green Flag incentive program ===
While clean trucks were a focus, the Port of Long Beach also turned its attention to ships. The Green Flag incentive program was set up to encourage ships to slow down in order to improve air quality. The Green Flag program provides approximately $2 million a year in discounts for vessel operators who slow their ships to 12 knots (22 km/h) or less within 20 miles (32 km) of the harbor. According to the port, the Green Flag program reduced air pollution by 600 tons in 2007 and was expected to do better in 2008.

The port has donated millions of dollars to select Southern California wetlands projects, including a $50 million donation to the Bolsa Chica Ecological Reserve in Huntington Beach. Port of Long Beach officials looking into helping restore and revitalize the Los Cerritos Wetlands.

== Governance ==
The Port of Long Beach is governed by the City of Long Beach. The City Charter created the Long Beach Harbor Department to promote and develop the port. Under the charter, the five-member Board of Harbor Commissioners is responsible for setting policy for the port and managing the Harbor Department.

The Harbor Commissioners set policies for the Port of Long Beach. Commissioners are appointed by the Mayor of Long Beach and are confirmed by the City Council. They may serve no more than three four-year terms. In July, the commissioners rotate the offices of president and vice president. These offices are held for one year.

== Community relations ==
To help improve relations with the Long Beach and surrounding towns, Port of Long Beach started a number of outreach events.

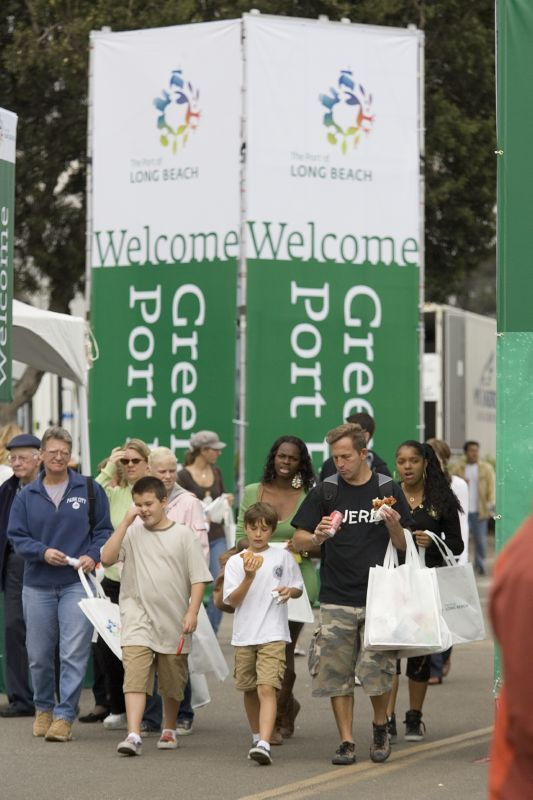
Green Port Fest attracts thousands of residents from Southern California every year

- Green Port Fest was started in 2005, the annual event allows the public to see port operations and learn more about the port's environmental and security programs. The family festival has boat tours and interactive exhibits.
- To educate the public, the Port of Long Beach also hosts free boat tours during the summer. The tours offer a 90-minute narrated cruise of the port. All tours are posted two months in advance and are generally booked within days.
- The Port of Long Beach hosts public outreach events called "Let’s Talk Port". These are forums where the community can learn and ask questions about the port.
- Graduating high school seniors in the Long Beach Unified School District service area can apply for scholarships toward higher education that range from $500 to $6,000. The scholarships are awarded to graduating students who plan to pursue careers in international trade or other port-related industries. Scholarships are also awarded to international business students who attend Long Beach City College and California State University, Long Beach.

== Security ==
=== Command and Control Center ===
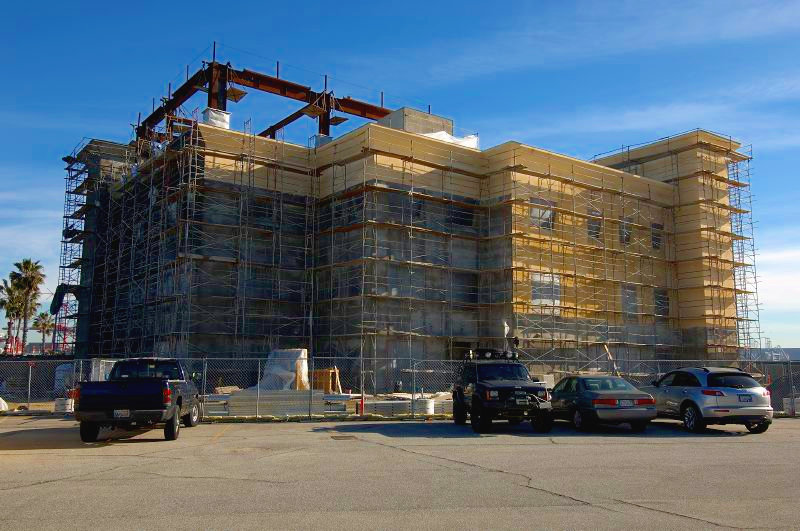
A new "green" Command and Control Center is being built.

In February 2009, the Port opened a $21 million command center. The Command and Control Center conforms to the port's Green Port Policy of being energy efficient.

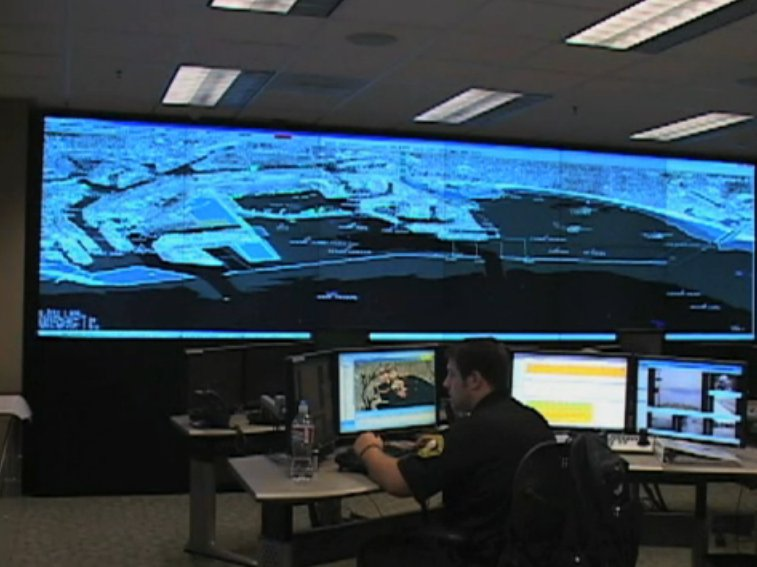
Security officer watches the port, detecting all ships within 11 miles of the facility.

=== Harbor Patrol ===
The Long Beach Harbor Patrol is a group of trained and armed public officers dedicated to security and public safety at the Port of Long Beach. Harbor Patrol officers monitor port facilities and public roads, respond to dispatches, and have authority to access all marine terminals and cargo at the port.

In addition, Harbor Patrol operates round-the-clock camera surveillance, mobile underwater sonar, dive team, explosive detectors, and other technology to protect port facilities and operations.

== See also ==
- Port of Los Angeles Long Wharf Santa Monica
- United States container ports
- Long Beach International Gateway
- Long Beach Harbor Patrol
