= SS Auriga =

A number of steamships were named Auriga, including:

- SS Auriga (1909), an Italian passenger ship in service 1949–57
- SS Auriga (1944), a Hansa A Type cargo ship in service 1956–65
