= MSC Orion-class container ship =

Container ship class

Class overview
- Builders: Hyundai Heavy Industries
- Operators: Mediterranean Shipping Company, Ocean Network Express
- In service: 2020–present
- Planned: 8
- Completed: 8
- Active: 8

General characteristics
- Type: Container ship
- Tonnage: 149,525 GT
- Length: 366 m (1,200 ft 9 in)
- Beam: 51 m (167 ft 4 in)
- Draught: 16 m (52 ft 6 in)
- Capacity: 14,952 TEU

The Orion class is a series of 8 container ships built for Zodiac Maritime. The first 4 ships are operated by Mediterranean Shipping Company (MSC) and the remaining ships are operated by Ocean Network Express (ONE). The ships were built by Hyundai Heavy Industries in South Korea. The ships have a maximum theoretical capacity of 14,952 twenty-foot equivalent units (TEU).

== List of ships ==
Ship	Yard number	IMO number	Delivery	Status	ref
Mediterranean Shipping Company
MSC Orion	3029	9857157	22 Jan 2020	In service	
MSC Aries	3030	9857169	9 Mar 2020	In service	
MSC Virgo	3031	9857171	8 Jun 2020	In service	
MSC Auriga	3032	9857183	15 Jul 2020	In service	
Ocean Network Express
Zenith Lumos	3033	9864215	21 Sep 2020	In service	
Zephyr Lumos	3034	9864227	6 Jan 2021	In service	
Zeus Lumos	3035	9864239	10 Mar 2021	In service	
Zeal Lumos	3036	9864241	30 Jul 2021	In service	

== Incidents ==
On April 13, 2024, during the Red Sea crisis, the IRGC Navy seized Portuguese-registered and Madeira-flagged MSC Aries. The ship was off the UAE coast and was taken to Iran, which claimed that it had violated maritime laws.

On April 26, MSC Orion, sister ship to MSC Aries, was struck by a drone, 300 to 400 nautical miles southeast of the Horn of Africa, extending Houthi Red Sea attacks to the Indian Ocean.
