= List of ship launches in 2013 =

The list of ship launches in 2013 includes a chronological list of ships launched in 2013.

Date	Ship	Class / type	Builder	Location	Country	Notes
5 January	APL Temasek	Temasek-class container ship	Hyundai Samho Heavy Industries	Samho-eup	South Korea	For American President Lines
12 January	NYK Hercules	OOCL M-class container ship	Samsung Heavy Industries	Geoje	South Korea	For Orient Overseas Container Line
13 January	Margaret Norvell	Sentinel-class cutter	Bollinger Shipyards	Lockport, Louisiana	United States	For United States Coast Guard
17 January	Vale Korea	Valemax	Daewoo Shipbuilding & Marine Engineering	Okpo-dong, South Gyeongsang Province	South Korea	For Vale Shipping
25 January	AIDAstella	SPHINX	Meyer Werft	Papenburg	Germany	AIDA Crociere
25 January	Reestborg		Ferus Smit	Leer	Germany	For Wagenborg Shipping
25 January	Shanghai Express	Hamburg Express-class container ship	Hyundai Heavy Industries	Ulsan	South Korea	For Hapag Lloyd
6 February	U-36	Type 212 submarine	HDW	Kiel	Germany	For German Navy
8 February	MOL Quest	Temasek-class container ship	Hyundai Samho Heavy Industries	Samho-eup	South Korea	For Mitsui O.S.K. Lines
11 February	Ludwigshafen Express	Hamburg Express-class container ship	Hyundai Heavy Industries	Ulsan	South Korea	For Hapag Lloyd
24 February	Mærsk Mc-Kinney Møller	Maersk Triple E class	Daewoo	Geoje	South Korea	For Maersk Line
24 February	OOCL Chongqing	OOCL M-class container ship	Samsung Heavy Industries	Geoje	South Korea	For Orient Overseas Container Line
26 February	Norwegian Breakaway	Breakaway-class cruise ship	Meyer Werft	Papenburg	Germany	for NCL
1 March	Bergensfjord	Cruise ferry	Stocznia Gdansk	Gdańsk	Poland	For Fjord Line
3 March	Ore Rio de Janeiro	Valemax-class bulk carrier	Jiangsu Rongsheng			
5 March	Volgaborg		Ferus Smit	Westerbroek	Netherlands	For Wagenborg Shipping
8 March	Cap San Nicolas	Cap San-class container ship	Hyundai Heavy Industries	Ulsan	South Korea	For Hamburg Süd
17 March	Damavand	Moudge-class frigate	Shahid Tamjidi Marine Industries	Bandar-e Anzali, Iran	Iran	For Islamic Republic of Iran Navy
22 March	S. Dudka	Fishery protection vessel	ABCO Industries Lunenburg Shipyard	Lunenburg, Nova Scotia	Canada	For Canadian Coast Guard
23 March	APL Raffles	Temasek-class container ship	Hyundai Samho Heavy Industries	Samho-eup	South Korea	For American President Lines
26 March	Regal Princess	Royal-class cruise ship	Fincantieri	Monfalcone, Italy.	Italy	For Princess Cruises
26 March	Kiltan	Kamorta-class corvette	Garden Reach Shipbuilders & Engineers	Kolkata	India	For Indian Navy
27 March	Majestic Mærsk	Maersk Triple E class	Daewoo	Geoje	South Korea	For Maersk Line
27 March	Maury	Pathfinder-class survey ship	VT Halter Marine	Pascagoula, Mississippi	United States	For United States Navy
30 March	NYK Hermes	OOCL M-class container ship	Samsung Heavy Industries	Geoje	South Korea	For Orient Overseas Container Line
12 April	Antwerpen Express	Hamburg Express-class container ship	Hyundai Heavy Industries	Ulsan	South Korea	For Hapag Lloyd
12 April	Cap San Marco	Cap San-class container ship	Hyundai Heavy Industries	Ulsan	South Korea	For Hamburg Süd
26 April	MOL Quality	Temasek-class container ship	Hyundai Samho Heavy Industries	Samho-eup	South Korea	For Mitsui O.S.K. Lines
3 May	FSRU Independence	LNG carrier	Hyundai Heavy Industries			For Leif Höegh & Co
3 May	Cap San Lorenzo	Cap San-class container ship	Hyundai Heavy Industries	Ulsan	South Korea	For Hamburg Süd
4 May	Mary Mærsk	Maersk Triple E class	Daewoo	Geoje	South Korea	For Maersk Line
4 May	OOCL Bangkok	OOCL M-class container ship	Samsung Heavy Industries	Geoje	South Korea	For Orient Overseas Container Line
16 May	Cap San Augustin	Cap San-class container ship	Hyundai Heavy Industries	Ulsan	South Korea	For Hamburg Süd
18 May	Marie Mærsk	Maersk Triple E class	Daewoo	Geoje	South Korea	For Maersk Line
29 May	Viking ADCC	Cruiseferry	Astilleros de Sevilla	Seville	Spain	For Viking Line
31 May	Oceanex Connaigra	ConRo-ship	Flensburger Schiffbau-Gesellschaft	Flensburg	Germany	For Oceanex Inc.
1 June	APL Vanda	Temasek-class container ship	Hyundai Samho Heavy Industries	Samho-eup	South Korea	For American President Lines
5 June	Millinocket	Spearhead-class expeditionary fast transport	Austal USA	Blakeley Island Alabama	United States	For United States Navy
15 June	NYK Hyperion	OOCL M-class container ship	Samsung Heavy Industries	Geoje	South Korea	For Orient Overseas Container Line
21 June	Thalassa Hellas	Thalassa Hellas-class container ship	Hyundai Heavy Industries	Geoje	South Korea	For Evergreen Marine
29 June	Virginio Fasan	FREMM multipurpose frigate	Fincantieri	Riva Trigoso	Italy	For Italian Navy
6 July	APL Agile	Temasek-class container ship	Hyundai Samho Heavy Industries	Samho-eup	South Korea	For American President Lines
13 July	Madison Mærsk	Maersk Triple E class	Daewoo	Geoje	South Korea	For Maersk Line
15 July	Ubaldo Diciotti	Dattilo-class offshore patrol vessel	Fincantieri	Castellammare di Stabia	Italy	For Italy Coast Guard
2 August	Turva	Offshore patrol vessel	STX Finland	Rauma, Finland	Finland	For Finnish Border Guard
6 August	Izumo	Izumo-class helicopter destroyer	IHI Corporation	Yokohama	Japan	For Japan Maritime Self-Defense Force
10 August	Hamilton	Legend-class cutter	NGSS Ingalls	Pascagoula, Mississippi	United States	For United States Coast Guard
12 August	Vikrant	Aircraft carrier	Cochin Shipyard	Kochi	India	For Indian Navy
16 August	Leverkusen Express	Hamburg Express-class container ship	Hyundai Heavy Industries	Ulsan	South Korea	For Hapag Lloyd
17 August	APL Merlion	Temasek-class container ship	Hyundai Samho Heavy Industries	Samho-eup	South Korea	For American President Lines
23 August	Judith		GS Yard	Waterhuizen	Netherlands	
29 August	North Dakota	Virginia-class submarine	General Dynamics Electric Boat		United States	For United States Navy
30 August	Rolldock Star	S-class Heavy lift ship	Flensburger Schiffbau-Gesellschaft	Flensburg, Germany	Germany	For Rolldock
3 September	Ramform Atlas	Ramform Titan-class research vessel	Mitsubishi Heavy Ind., Ltd.	Nagasaki	Japan	
6 September	Thalassa Patris	Thalassa Hellas-class container ship	Hyundai Heavy Industries	Geoje	South Korea	For Evergreen Marine
6 September	Ludwigshafen Express	Hamburg Express-class container ship	Hyundai Heavy Industries	Ulsan	South Korea	For Hapag Lloyd
8 September	Viking Buri	Viking Longships-class river cruise ship	Neptun Werft	Rostock-Warnemünde	Germany	For Viking Cruises
8 September	Hyundai Dream	Hyundai Dream-class container ship	Hyundai Heavy Industries	Geoje	South Korea	For Hyundai Merchant Marine
15 September	John Glenn	Expeditionary Transfer Dock	National Steel and Shipbuilding Company	San Diego, California	United States	For Military Sealift Command
18 September	Provence	FREMM multipurpose frigate	DCNS		France	For French Navy
19 September	Megantic		GS Yard	Waterhuizen	Netherlands	
27 September	Cap San Antonio	Cap San-class container ship	Hyundai Heavy Industries	Ulsan	South Korea	For Hamburg Süd
28 September	MOL Quasar	Temasek-class container ship	Hyundai Samho Heavy Industries	Samho-eup	South Korea	For Mitsui O.S.K. Lines
29 September	Nunavik	Bulk carrier	Japan Marine United	Tsu, Mie	Japan	For Fednav
5 October	Magleby Maersk	Maersk Triple E class	Daewoo	Geoje	South Korea	For Maersk Line
15 October	Vladivostok	Mistral-class amphibious assault ship	STX France	Saint Nazaire	France	For Russian Navy
17 October	Manito		GS Yard	Waterhuizen	Netherlands	
25 October	Thalassa Pistis	Thalassa Hellas-class container ship	Hyundai Heavy Industries	Geoje	South Korea	For Evergreen Marine
28 October	Zumwalt	Zumwalt-class destroyer	Bath Iron Works	Bath, Maine	United States	For United States Navy
2 November	APL Ascend	Temasek-class container ship	Hyundai Samho Heavy Industries	Samho-eup	South Korea	For American President Lines
2 November	Norwegian Getaway	Breakaway-class cruise ship	Meyer Werft	Papenburg, Germany	Germany	for NCL
3 November	Samuel Beckett	Samuel Beckett-class offshore patrol vessel	Babcock Marine	North Devon	United Kingdom	For Irish Naval Service
8 November	Mein Schiff 3	Cruise ship	STX Finland	Turku, Finland	Finland	For TUI Cruises
8 November	Cap San Raphael	Cap San-class container ship	Hyundai Heavy Industries	Ulsan	South Korea	For Hamburg Süd
9 November	Gerald R. Ford	Gerald R. Ford-class aircraft carrier	Newport News Shipbuilding		United States	for United States Navy
9 November	Maribo Maersk	Maersk Triple E class	Daewoo	Geoje	South Korea	For Maersk Line
15 November	Costa Diadema	Dream-class cruise ship	Fincantieri	Marghera, Italy	Italy	For Costa Cruises
15 November	Arklow Bank		Ferus Smit	Westerbroek	Netherlands	For Arklow Shipping
2 December	Shabab Oman II	Sail training ship	Damen Shipyards	Galaţi	Romania	For Royal Navy of Oman
3 December	Prelude FLNG	Floating liquefied natural gas plant	Samsung Heavy Industries	Geoje	South Korea	For Shell
7 December	Marstal Maersk	Maersk Triple E class	Daewoo	Geoje	South Korea	For Maersk Line
10 December	Charles Sexton	Sentinel-class cutter	Bollinger Shipyards	Lockport, Louisiana	United States	For United States Coast Guard
12 December	Baltika	Icebreaker	Arctech Helsinki Shipyard	Helsinki	Finland	For FGI Gosmorspassluzhba
13 December	Cap San Artemissio	Cap San-class container ship	Hyundai Heavy Industries	Ulsan	South Korea	For Hamburg Süd
14 December	Jackson	Independence-class littoral combat ship	Austal USA	Mobile, Alabama	United States	For United States Navy
14 December	APL Aspire	Temasek-class container ship	Hyundai Samho Heavy Industries	Samho-eup	South Korea	For American President Lines
18 December	Reggeborg		Ferus Smit	Leer	Germany	For Wagenborg Shipping
18 December	Milwaukee	Freedom-class littoral combat ship	Marinette Marine	Marinette, Wisconsin	United States	For United States Navy
24 December	Vale Tianjin	Valemax-class bulk carrier	Jiangsu Rongsheng			
24 December	Thalassa Elpida	Thalassa Hellas-class container ship	Hyundai Heavy Industries	Geoje	South Korea	For Evergreen Marine
Unknown date	Chilembwe	Passenger ship	Mota Engil		Malawi	For Malawi Shipping Company
Unknown date	Dalby Aire	Crew transfer vessel	Alicat Workboats Ltd.	Great Yarmouth	United Kingdom	For Dalby Offshore Services Ltd.
Unknown date	Gardian 14	Crew transfer vessel	Alicat Workboats Ltd.	Great Yarmouth	United Kingdom	For Gardline Environmental Ltd.
Unknown date	Rix Tiger	Wind farm service vessel	Alnmaritec Ltd	Blyth	United Kingdom	For he Rix Tiger Workboat Ltd. - Rix Sea Shuttle Ltd.
Unknown date	Solway Challenger	Crew transfer vessel	Alicat Workboats Ltd.	Great Yarmouth	United Kingdom	For E.On Climate & Renewables UK Ltd.
Unknown date	Spirit of Hotton	Crew transfer vessel	Alicat Workboats Ltd.	Great Yarmouth	United Kingdom	For E.On Climate & Renewables UK Ltd.
Unknown date	Titan Discovery	Workboat	Alicat Workboats Ltd.	Great Yarmouth	United Kingdom	For Titan Environmental Surveys Ltd.
