= List of ship launches in 2014 =

The list of ship launches in 2014 includes a chronological list of ships launched in 2014.

Date	Ship	Class / type	Builder	Location	Country	Notes
4 January	Matz Maersk	Maersk Triple E class	Daewoo	Geoje	South Korea	For Maersk Line
11 January	OOCL Korea	OOCL M-class container ship	Samsung Heavy Industries	Geoje	South Korea	For Orient Overseas Container Line
11 January	Hyundai Drive	Hyundai Dream-class container ship	Hyundai Heavy Industries	Geoje	South Korea	For Hyundai Merchant Marine
17 January	Cap San Maleas	Cap San-class container ship	Hyundai Heavy Industries	Ulsan	South Korea	For Hamburg Süd
23 January	Chantal		GS Yard	Waterhuizen	Netherlands	
24 January	T.ESRA	Tanker	RMK Marine	Tuzla, Turkey	Turkey	For Ditaş
29 January	Ulsan Express	Hamburg Express-class container ship	Hyundai Heavy Industries	Ulsan	South Korea	For Hapag Lloyd
31 January	Breeze	Platform supply vessel	BAE Systems	Jacksonville, United States	United States	For Jackson Offshore
31 January	Rolldock Storm	S-class Heavy lift ship	Flensburger Schiffbau-Gesellschaft	Flensburg, Germany	Germany	For Rolldock
January	Lilly Johanne	Live fish carrier	Celiktrans Shipyard	Tuzla	Turkey	For Aqua Star
3 February	Ocean Marilin	Field support vessel	Zamakona Yards	Pasajes, Spain	Spain	For Atlantic Offshore
5 February	Red Hook 1	Catamaran ferry	Midship Marine	Louisiana, United States	United States	To operate in US Virgin Islands.
5 February	Cruz Bay 1	Catamaran ferry	Midship Marine	Louisiana, United States	United States	To operate in US Virgin Islands.
7 February	UAL Cologne		Royal Bodenwes	Hoogezand	Netherlands	for Universal African Lines
7 February	Thalassa Avra	Thalassa Hellas-class container ship	Hyundai Heavy Industries	Geoje	South Korea	For Evergreen Marine
8 February	Un-Named	RO-RO ferry.	Uljanik	Pula, Croatia	Croatia	For Jadrolinija.
11 February	SCF Mitre	Tanker	STX Offshore & Shipbuilding	South Korea	South Korea	For Sovcomflot OJSC.
14 February	Britannia	Cruise ship	Fincantieri	Monfalcone, Italy.	Italy	For P&O Cruises.
22 February	RV Neil Armstrong	Research vessel	Dakota Creep Shipyards	Washington, United States.	United States	For the United States Navy.
22 February	OOCL Singapore	OOCL M-class container ship	Samsung Heavy Industries	Geoje	South Korea	For Orient Overseas Container Line
24 February	UAL Cologne	Container ship	Bodewes Shipyards	Hoogezand, Netherlands.	Netherlands	For Universal Africa Lines.
28 February	Cap San Sounio	Cap San-class container ship	Hyundai Heavy Industries	Ulsan	South Korea	For Hamburg Süd
1 March	Polarsyssel	Platform supply vessel	Cemre Shipyard	Altinova, Turkey.	Turkey	For Norwegian Havyard Group.
2 March	Viking Kara	Viking Longships-clall river cruise ship	Neptun Werft	Rostock-Warnemünde	Germany	For Viking Cruises
3 March	M/Y CRN 133	Superyacht	CRN Spa	Ancona, Italy.	Italy	Designed by Francesco Paszkowski.
7 March	PE-65	Tugboat	Pella	Saint Petersburg, Russia.	Russia	For the Russia Navy.
7 March	Arklow Bay		Ferus Smit	Westerbroek	Netherlands	For Arklow Shipping
8 March	Al Bahar	Cutter suction dredger	IHC Merwede	Kinderdijk, Netherlands.	Netherlands	For Huta Marine Works.
8 March	Mayview Mærsk	Maersk Triple E class	Daewoo	Geoje	South Korea	For Maersk Line
10 March	Ahto	Port icebreaker	Uki Workboat	Uusikaupunki, Finland.	Finland	For Arctia Karhu Oy.
21 March	Thalassa Niki	Thalassa Hellas-class container ship	Hyundai Heavy Industries	Geoje	South Korea	For Evergreen Marine
29 March	Carabiniere	FREMM multipurpose frigate	Fincantieri	Riva Trigoso	Italy	For Italian Navy
31 March	Baden-Württemberg	F125-class frigate	Blohm + Voss	Hamburg	Germany	For German Navy
4 April	Cap San Tairano	Cap San-class container ship	Hyundai Heavy Industries	Ulsan	South Korea	For Hamburg Süd
5 April	Sonne	research vessel	Meyer Werft	Papenburg, Germany	Germany	For Federal Ministry of Education and Research (Germany)
9 April	Ampere	electric ferry	ALU International Shipyard Spólka z o.o	Gdańsk	Poland	For Norled
11 April	Thalassa Mana	Thalassa Hellas-class container ship	Hyundai Heavy Industries	Geoje	South Korea	For Evergreen Marine
18 April	Pacific Dragon	Anchor handling tug supply vessel	ST Marine	Unknown Shipyard	Singapore	For Swire Pacific Offshore Operations.
20 April	Merete Mærsk	Maersk Triple E class	Daewoo	Geoje	South Korea	For Maersk Line
23 April	Deep Helder	Subsea support vessel	De Hoop’s shipyard	Groningen, Netherlands	Netherlands	For DeepOcean.
29 April	Vladivostok	Icebreaker	ОАО Vyborg Shipyard	Vyborg, Russia	Russia	
30 April	Stanford Mustang	Anchor Handling Tug	Fujian Mawei Shipyard	Fuzhou, China	China	For Stanford Marine.
30 April	VOS Faithful	Emergency Response and Rescue Vessel (ERRV)	East Star Shipyard	Nanjing, China	China	For Vroon Offshore Services.
2 May	Bugsier 7	tug	Fassmer		Germany	For Bugsier-, Reederei- und Bergungsgesellschaft
3 May	Aidaprima	Hyperion-class cruise ship	Mitsubishi Heavy Industries	Nagasaki	Japan	For AIDA Cruises
3 May	USCGC James	Legend-class cutter	NGSS Ingalls	Pascagoula, Mississippi	United States	For United States Coast Guard
5 May	Cape Nelson	Cape-class patrol boat	Austal	Henderson, Australia	Australia	For the Australian Customs and Border Protection Service.
9 May	Thalassa Thyi	Thalassa Hellas-class container ship	Hyundai Heavy Industries	Geoje	South Korea	For Evergreen Marine
10 May	Wind Server	wind turbine installation vessel	Nordic Yards	Wismar	Germany	For DBB Jack-Up Services
16 May	RB-407	Tugboat	Pella	Otradnoye, Russia	Russia	For the Russian Navy
17 May	HMS Artful	Astute-class submarine	BAE Systems Maritime – Submarines	Barrow-in-Furness	United Kingdom	For Royal Navy
23 May	Thalassa Doxa	Thalassa Hellas-class container ship	Hyundai Heavy Industries	Geoje	South Korea	For Evergreen Marine
23 May	San Clemente	container ship	Hyundai Heavy Industries	Ulsan	South Korea	For Hamburg Süd
29 May	Viking Eir	Viking Longships-clall river cruise ship	Neptun Werft	Rostock-Warnemünde	Germany	For Viking Cruises
31 May	Mogens Mærsk	Maersk Triple E class	Daewoo	Geoje	South Korea	For Maersk Line
3 June	Maria Theresa	passenger ship	GS Yard	Waterhuizen	Netherlands	
6 June	Arklow Beach		Ferus Smit	Westerbroek	Netherlands	For Arklow Shipping
15 June	Viking Lofn	Viking Longships-clall river cruise ship	Neptun Werft	Rostock-Warnemünde	Germany	For Viking Cruises
23 June	Viking Star	Venice-class cruise ship	Fincantieri	Marghera	Italy	For Viking Ocean Cruises
28 June	Morten Mærsk	Maersk Triple E class	Daewoo	Geoje	South Korea	For Maersk Line
28 June	F.-A.-Gauthier	ferry	Fincantieri	Castellammare di Stabia	Italy	For Société des traversiers du Québec
3 July	ROKS Yun Bong-gil	Type 214 submarine	Hyundai Heavy Industries		Republic of Korea Navy	For South Korean Navy
4 July	Roerborg		Ferus Smit	Leer	Germany	For Wagenborg Shipping
4 July	San Christobal	container ship	Hyundai Heavy Industries	Ulsan	South Korea	For Hamburg Süd
6 July	Viking Vidar	Viking Longships-clall river cruise ship	Neptun Werft	Rostock-Warnemünde	Germany	For Viking Cruises
11 July	Thalassa Axia	Thalassa Hellas-class container ship	Hyundai Heavy Industries	Geoje	South Korea	For Evergreen Marine
12 July	Languedoc	FREMM multipurpose frigate	DCNS		France	For French Navy
17 July	HMS Queen Elizabeth	Queen Elizabeth-class aircraft carrier	VT Group		United Kingdom	For Royal Navy
17 July	Mistral	luxury yacht	Lürssen Kröger-Werft	Schacht-Audorf	Germany	
21 July	MV Maersk Tigris	container ship	Hanjin Heavy Industries and Construction Philippines	Subic Bay	Philippines	
6 August	USS Montgomery	Independence-class littoral combat ship	Austal USA	Mobile, Alabama	United States	For US Navy
13 August	Quantum of the Seas	Quantum-class cruise ship	Meyer Werft	Papenburg, Germany	Germany	For Royal Caribbean International
13 August	Vale Rizhao	Valemax-class bulk carrier	Jiangsu Rongsheng			
15 August	Munkebo Mærsk	Maersk Triple E class	Daewoo	Geoje	South Korea	For Maersk Line
23 August	CSCL Globe	Globe-class container ship	Hyundai Heavy Industries		South Korea	For China Shipping Container Lines
29 August	San Vicente	container ship	Hyundai Heavy Industries	Ulsan	South Korea	For Hamburg Süd
1 September	Viking Modi	Viking Longships-clall river cruise ship	Neptun Werft	Rostock-Warnemünde	Germany	For Viking Cruises
6 September	USS John Warner	Virginia-class submarine	Newport News Shipbuilding		United States	For US Navy
13 September	Maren Mærsk	Maersk Triple E class	Daewoo	Geoje	South Korea	For Maersk Line
19 September	Arklow Beacon		Ferus Smit	Westerbroek	Netherlands	For Arklow Shipping
20 September	Vale Ningbo	Valemax-class bulk carrier	Jiangsu Rongsheng			
21 September	Viking Gefjon	Viking Longships-clall river cruise ship	Neptun Werft	Rostock-Warnemünde	Germany	For Viking Cruises
26 September	Sajir	UASC A15-class container ship	Hyundai Heavy Industries	Ulsan	South Korea	For United Arab Shipping Company
2 October	Viking Ve	Viking Longships-clall river cruise ship	Neptun Werft	Rostock-Warnemünde	Germany	For Viking Cruises
6 October	CSCL Pacific Ocean	Globe-class container ship	Hyundai Heavy Industries	Ulsan	South Korea	For China Shipping Container Lines
8 October	Bugsier 8	tug	Fassmer		Germany	For Bugsier-, Reederei- und Bergungsgesellschaft
9 October	Pietro Venuti	Type 212 submarine	Fincantieri	Muggiano	Italy	For Italian Navy
10 October	Mein Schiff 4	Cruise ship	Meyer Turku Shipyard	Turku, Finland	Finland	For TUI Cruises
18 October	USS Detroit	Freedom-class littoral combat ship	Marinette Marine	Marinette, Wisconsin	United States	
23 October	Le Lyrial	cruise ship	Fincantieri	Ancona	Italy	For Compagnie du Ponant
1 November	CSCL Atlantic Ocean	Globe-class container ship	Hyundai Heavy Industries	Ulsan	South Korea	For China Shipping Container Lines
1 November	Al Murabba	UASC A15-class container ship	Hyundai Samho Heavy Industries		South Korea	For United Arab Shipping Company
3 November	Samuel Beckett	Samuel Beckett-class offshore patrol vessel	Babcock Marine Ltd.	Appledore	United Kingdom	For Irish Naval Service.
13 November	Calimero		GS Yard	Waterhuizen	Netherlands	
14 November	Salahuddin	UASC A15-class container ship	Hyundai Heavy Industries	Ulsan	South Korea	For United Arab Shipping Company
15 November	CSCL Indian Ocean	Globe-class container ship	Hyundai Heavy Industries	Ulsan	South Korea	For China Shipping Container Lines
20 November	Sevastopol	Mistral-class amphibious assault ship	STX France	Saint Nazaire	France	For Russian Navy
22 November	Margrethe Mærsk	Maersk Triple E class	Daewoo	Geoje	South Korea	For Maersk Line
30 November	Viking Beyla	river cruise ship	Neptun Werft	Warnemünde	Germany	For Viking River Cruises
4 December	Helgoland	passenger ship			Poland	For Reederei Cassen Eils
12 December	Arklow Brave		Ferus Smit	Westerbroek	Netherlands	For Arklow Shipping
13 December	Luigi Rizzo	FREMM multipurpose frigate	Fincantieri	Riva Trigoso	Italy	For Italian Navy
19 December	Royalist	Sail training ship	Astilleros Gondan SA		Spain	For Marine Society & Sea Cadets.
23 December	MSC Oscar	Olympic-class container ship	Daewoo		South Korea	For Mediterranean Shipping Company
23 December	CSCL Arctic Ocean	Globe-class container ship	Hyundai Heavy Industries	Ulsan	South Korea	For China Shipping Container Lines
December	Trearddur Bay	Crew transfer vessel	Aluminium Marine Consultants Ltd.	Cowes	United Kingdom	For Turbine Transfers Ltd.
Unknown date	Dalby Swale	Crew transfer vessel	Alicat Workboats Ltd.	Great Yarmouth	United Kingdom	For Dalby Offshore Services Ltd.
Unknown date	Iceni Conquest	Crew transfer vessel	Alicat Workboats Ltd.	Great Yarmouth	United Kingdom	For Iceni Marine Services Ltd.
Unknown date	Sally Ann	Workboat	Arklow Marine Services Inc.	Arklow	Ireland	For Scottish Sea Farms Ltd.
Unknown date	Spirit of Sunthorp	Crew transfer vessel	Alicat Workboats Ltd.	Great Yarmouth	United Kingdom	For E.On Climate & Renewables UK Ltd.
Unknown date	Spirit of Turmarr	Crew transfer vessel	Alicat Workboats Ltd.	Great Yarmouth	United Kingdom	For E.On Climate & Renewables UK Ltd.
