= APL Raffles =

Temasek-class Container Ship

History

Singapore
- Name: APL Raffles
- Operator: APL
- Port of registry: Singapore
- Ordered: 2013
- Builder: Hyundai Samho Heavy Industries
- Yard number: S632
- Launched: 23 March 2013
- Maiden voyage: 2013
- Identification: Call sign: 9V5388; IMO number: 9631979; MMSI number: 566881000
- Status: In service

General characteristics
- Type: Temasek-class container ship
- Tonnage: 151,963 GT; 150,936 DWT
- Length: 368 m (1,207 ft)
- Beam: 51 m (167 ft)
- Draft: 15.5 m (51 ft)
- Installed power: 63,910 kW
- Propulsion: Hyundai-MAN B&W 11S90ME-C9.2
- Speed: 22.5 knots (42 km/h) (maximum); 19.5 knots (36 km/h) (cruising)
- Capacity: 17,292 TEU

APL Raffles is a Temasek-class container ship operated by APL. It was built in 2013 by Hyundai Heavy Industries at their Samho shipyard in South Korea.

== Design and engineering ==
The ship has overall length of 398.50 m (1,307 ft), width of 51 m (167 ft) and summer draft of 15.50 m (50.9 ft). The vessel has deadweight of 150,936 DWT and gross tonnage is 151,963 GT, which allows maximum capacity for transportation of 13,900 TEU. The vessel is equipped with 1,200 reefer plugs for transportation of temperature controlled cargo.

== Engineering ==
The main engine is a Hyundai-MAN B&W 11S90ME-C9.2 with output power of 85,704 hp. The power is enough for the service to operate with speed of 19.5 kts, while the maximum speed under ballast exceeds 22.5 kts. The vessel has improved characteristics through lower resistance hull shape and paint, which reduces over-growth.
