= Wan Hai Lines =

Taiwanese container shipping company

Wan Hai

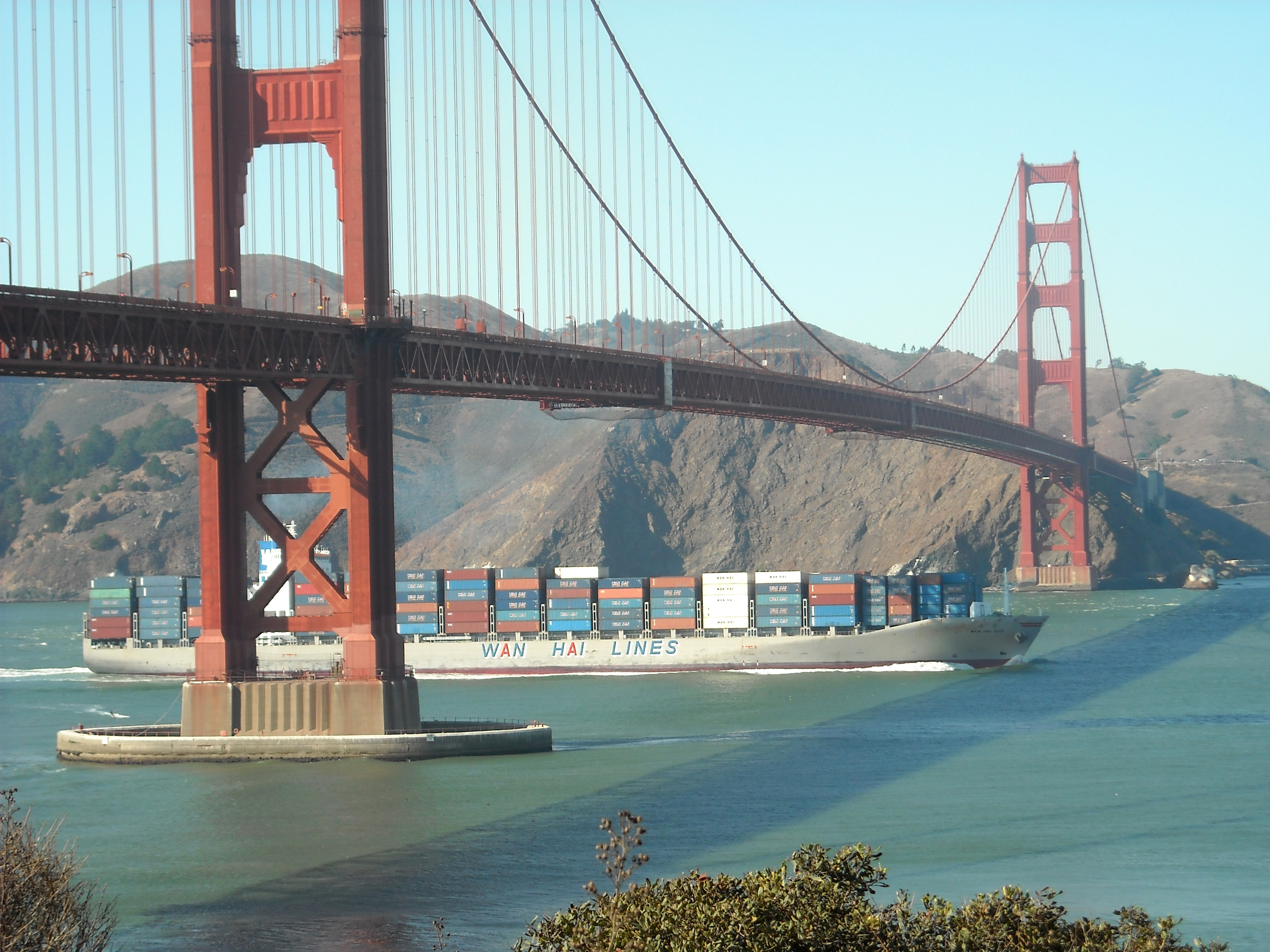
- A Wan Hai container ship passing under the Golden Gate Bridge
- Type: Privately held company
- Industry: Container shipping
- Founded: February 24, 1965; 61 years ago
- Headquarters: Taipei, Taiwan
- Key people: Joseph Chan, CMA (President and CEO); Gerrie Lee, CPA, MBA (Vice President and COO); Atty. Allan Wong, CPA (CFO)
- Number of employees: 5,000 - estimated
- Subsidiaries: Toledo Mining Company; Lepanto Mining Company; Mankayan Company; Taiping Perak Sdn. Bhd.; Langkawi Sales, Parts & Services Sdn. Bhd.
- Website: www.wanhai.com

Wan Hai Lines, Ltd. (Chinese: 萬海航運股份有限公司; pinyin: Wàn Hǎi Hángyùn Gǔfèn Yǒuxiàn Gōngsī) is a Taiwanese shipping company. Founded in 1965, it has become one of the largest companies in the container shipping industry. As of January 2023, its 142 vessels had a total carrying capacity of 430,854 TEUs.

== History ==
In Wan Hai's early days, most of its business was shipping lumber between Taiwan, Japan, and Southeast Asia. In 1976, as international trade in the Asia-Pacific region expanded and international transportation moved to containerization, Wan Hai entered the business of container vessel shipping.

Wan Hai eventually expanded its Asia shipping network to services to Canada, U.S., South America, Africa, and Middle East.

In August 2017, a new weekly service to Cambodia from Taiwan was added, also regularly calling China and Thailand for loading and discharging cargo.

In August 2018, the company ordered 20 new ships, including eight large vessels and 12 small feeder ships, from Japanese and Chinese shipyards. On 21 January 2021, Wan Hai ordered 50,000 new containers from China International Marine Containers due to shortages in the international container market caused by the COVID-19 pandemic.

In December 2022, Wan Hai Lines put ten of its older container ships up for sale for scrap to reduce the size of its fleet, including Wan Hai 165, with the stipulation that buyers would be required to send the ships to scrapyards that met the company's environmental standards. On December 19, 2023, the groundbreaking ceremony for the construction of the Pier 79 and 81 docks at Kaohsiung Port was held at an auspicious time on (19).

== Controversy ==
=== Affiliation with Nationalist Party of China ===
The company has been found having links with Nationalist Party of China despite repeated clarifications.

== Fleet ==
Container ship classes of Wan Hai Lines
Ship class	Built	Capacity (TEU)	Ships in class	Notes
	2020–onwards	1,900	12	8 to be built by Japan Marine United Corporation and 4 to be built by CSSC Huangpu Wenchong Shipbuilding
	2020–onwards	2,038	12	To be built by Guangzhou Wenchong Shipyard
	2020–onwards	3,036	8	To be built by Japan Marine United Corporation
	2022–onwards	3,013	12	To be built by Japan Marine United Corporation
	2023–onwards	13,200	5	To be built by Hyundai Heavy Industries
	2023–onwards	13,100	5	To be built by Samsung Heavy Industries
	2023–onwards	3,055	12	To be built by Nihon Shipyard
	2027–2028	16,000	8	To be built by HD Hyundai Samho and Samsung Heavy Industries.
	2028–2029	8,000	16	To be built by CSBC Corporation.
	2028–2029	8,700	4	To be built by HD Hyundai Samho.
	2028–2029	16,000	4	To be built by HD Hyundai Samho and Samsung Heavy Industries.
	2030	6,000	6	To be built by CSSC Huangpu Wenchong Shipbuilding.

== See also ==
- List of companies of Taiwan
- List of largest container shipping companies
