= CCGS Kelso =

Canadian Coast Guard scientific research vessel

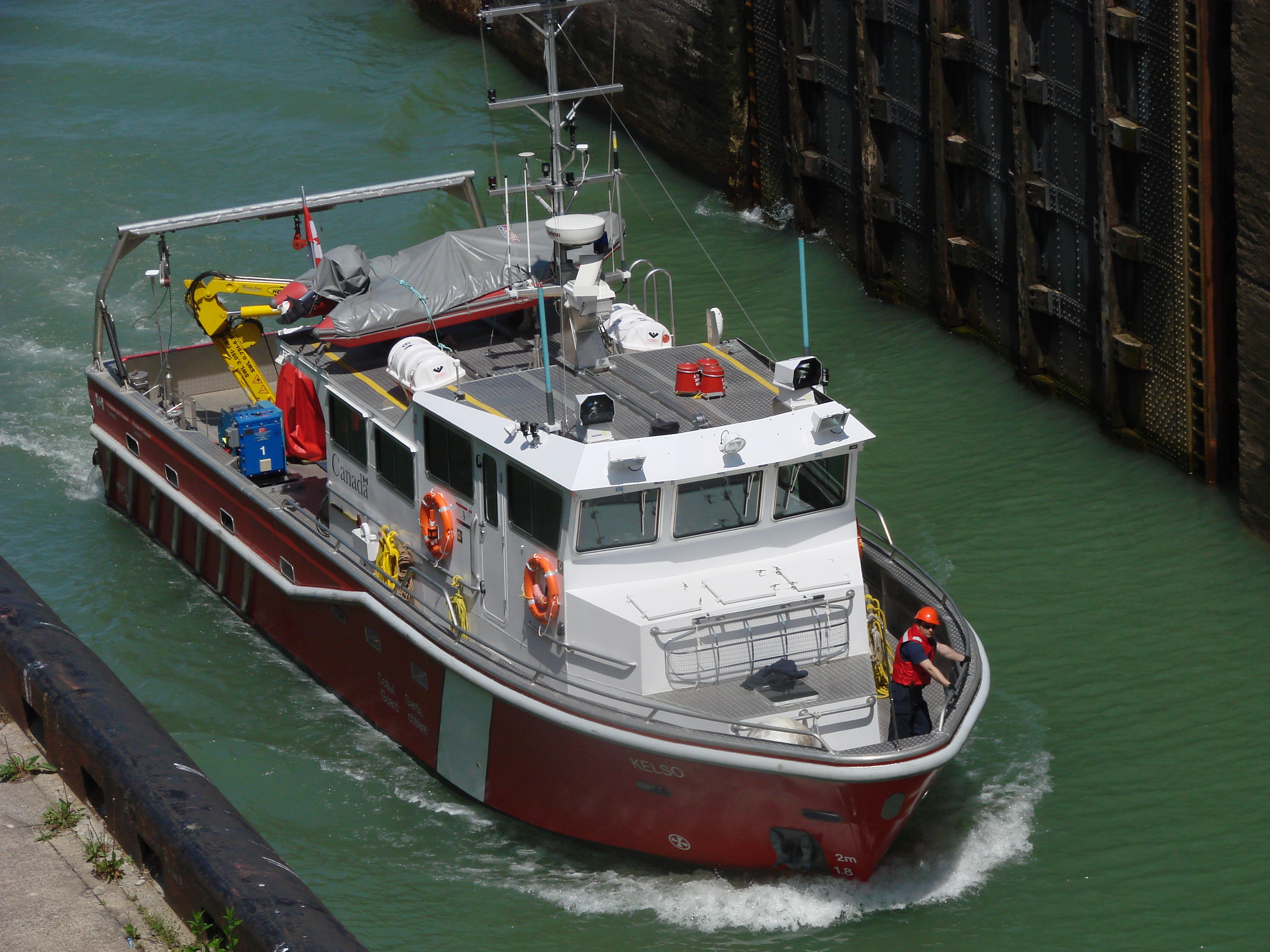
- CCGS Kelso in the Welland Canal

History

Canada
- Name: Kelso
- Namesake: Dr. John Kelso, late Fisheries and Oceans scientist
- Operator: Canadian Coast Guard
- Port of registry: Ottawa, Ontario
- Builder: ABCO Industries Lunenburg Shipyard of Lunenburg, Nova Scotia
- Commissioned: 2009
- In service: 2009-present
- Home port: CCG Base Burlington, Ontario - Central and Arctic Region
- Identification: MMSI number: 316014339; Callsign: CG8081
- Status: in active service

General characteristics
- Type: Near-shore fishery research vessel
- Displacement: 32 tonnes (35.27 short tons)
- Length: 17.95 m (58 ft 11 in)
- Beam: 5.24 m (17 ft 2 in)
- Draft: 1.5 m (4 ft 11 in)
- Propulsion: 2 × Volvo D-12, 500 hp (370 kW) diesel engines
- Speed: 16.2 knots (30.0 km/h) maximum
- Complement: 12 (3 crew and 10 seats for science crew)

CCGS Kelso is a scientific research vessel operated by the Canadian Coast Guard from CGS Base Burlington in the Central and Arctic Region of Canada. She was commissioned on September 8, 2009, by Terence Young, Member of Parliament for Oakville, at the Canadian Centre of Inland Waters in Burlington. The vessel was built by ABCO Industries Lunenburg Shipyard to replace the retiring CCGS Shark. The ship is named for the late Dr John Kelso, a noted scientist with the Department of Fisheries and Oceans, the parent department for the Coast Guard.

She is classed as a "Near Shore Fisheries Research Vessel" and intended for use in running trawls, box core sampling, bottom sampling and sampling for water quality analysis. This vessel has a maximum speed of 16.2 knots (30.0 km/h; 18.6 mph) and a cruising speed of 14 knots (26 km/h; 16 mph). The Kelso has a fuel capacity of 2,848 litres (626 imp gal; 752 US gal) and water capacity of 500 litres (110 imp gal; 130 US gal). She can seat ten passengers, in addition to her crew of three. She replaced CCGS Shark.

== See also ==
- CCGS Limnos
