= Stanley Dudka =

Canadian war hero (1923–2008)

- Born: 1923; New Glasgow, Nova Scotia
- Died: 2008 (aged 84–85); Halifax, Nova Scotia
- Occupation: Fishery officer
- Known for: Was personally decorated by King George VI

Stanley Dudka (1923-2008) was a decorated Canadian hero of World War II, and a Fishery officer who played a role in international fisheries monitoring.

== World War II service ==
Dudka joined the North Nova Scotia Highlanders, a Nova Scotia regiment, at 16 years old. He landed on Juno Beach on June 6, 1944, during the Battle of Normandy. He was wounded, and captured by German forces on June 7. While in captivity he witnessed the murder of other Canadian soldiers by General Kurt Meyer of the Waffen SS. He later testified against Meyer.

Dudka made three escape attempts before he made his way back to the Allied zone, where he was able to rejoin his regiment.

Dudka was awarded the Military Medal for distinguished service at Buckingham Palace by King George VI.

== Civilian life ==
Dudka was a coal miner from 1946 through 1958, when he started a distinguished career as a fishery officer.

Dudka and his wife had 12 children. Twenty-five of his descendants attended the commissioning of the CCGS S Dudka.

== The CCGS S Dudka ==
In March 2013 Fisheries and Oceans Canada launched a fishery patrol vessel named in Dudka's honour—the CCGS S Dudka.
