= Temasek-class container ship =

Merchant navy ships

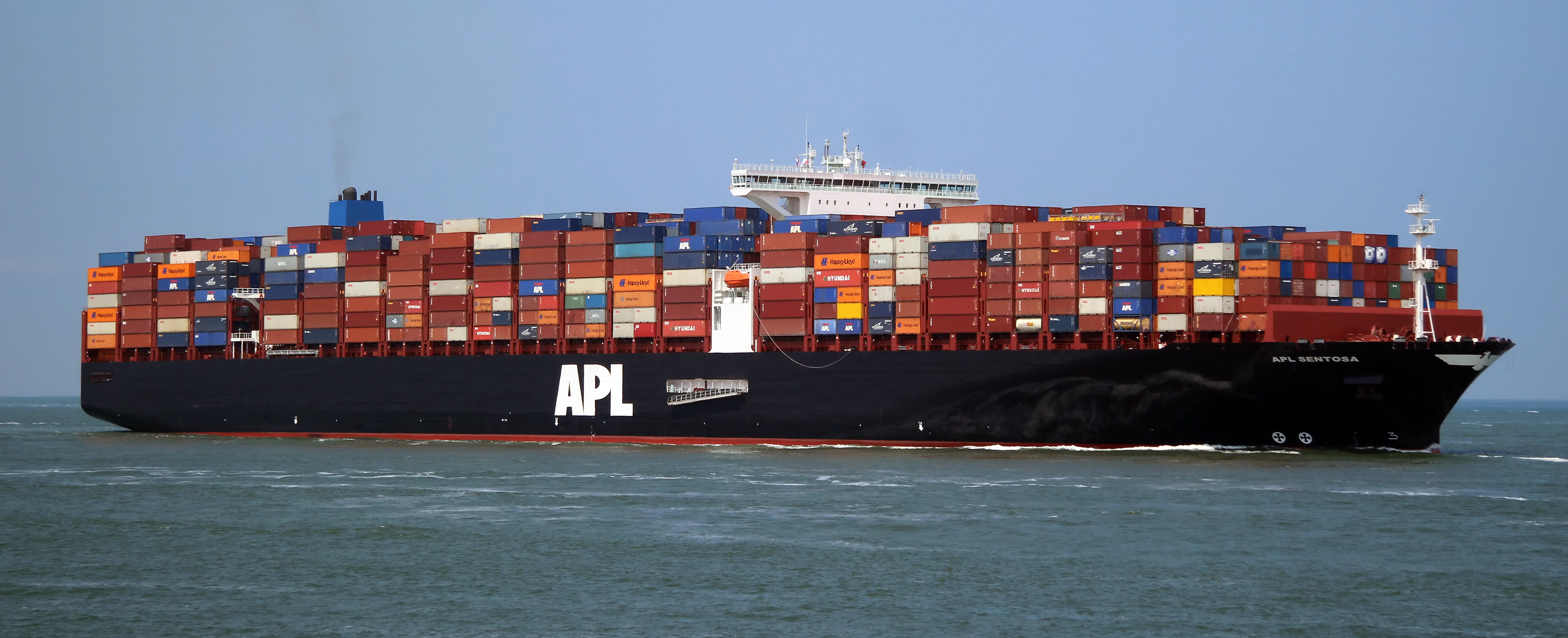
- APL Sentosa entering the port of Rotterdam

Class overview
- Builders: Hyundai Samho Heavy Industries
- Operators: APL
- In service: 2013–present
- Planned: 10
- Building: 0
- Completed: 10
- Active: 10

General characteristics (original)
- Type: Container ship
- Tonnage: 151,015 GT
- Length: 368 m (1,207 ft)
- Beam: 51 m (167 ft)
- Draught: 15.5 m (51 ft)
- Propulsion: MAN Diesel & Turbo B&W 11S90ME-C9.2
- Capacity: 13,892 TEU

General characteristics (upgrade)
- Type: Container ship
- Tonnage: 169,423 GT
- Length: 397.5 m (1,304 ft)
- Beam: 51 m (167 ft)
- Draught: 16 m (52 ft)
- Propulsion: MAN Diesel & Turbo B&W 11S90ME-C9.2
- Capacity: 17,292 TEU

The Temasek class is a class of container ships consisting of 10 ships in total. The ships were built for APL by Hyundai Samho Heavy Industries.

== History ==
The ships were originally ordered in 2011 by Neptune Orient Lines (NOL). They were to be delivered in 2013 and 2014. Five of the ships were chartered to Mitsui O.S.K. Lines (MOL). Construction started in 2012 and the first ship was delivered on 13 March 2013.

In 2017, around the same time as the first new Triumph-class container ship went into service the charter ended. The ships were renamed and became part of the APL fleet.

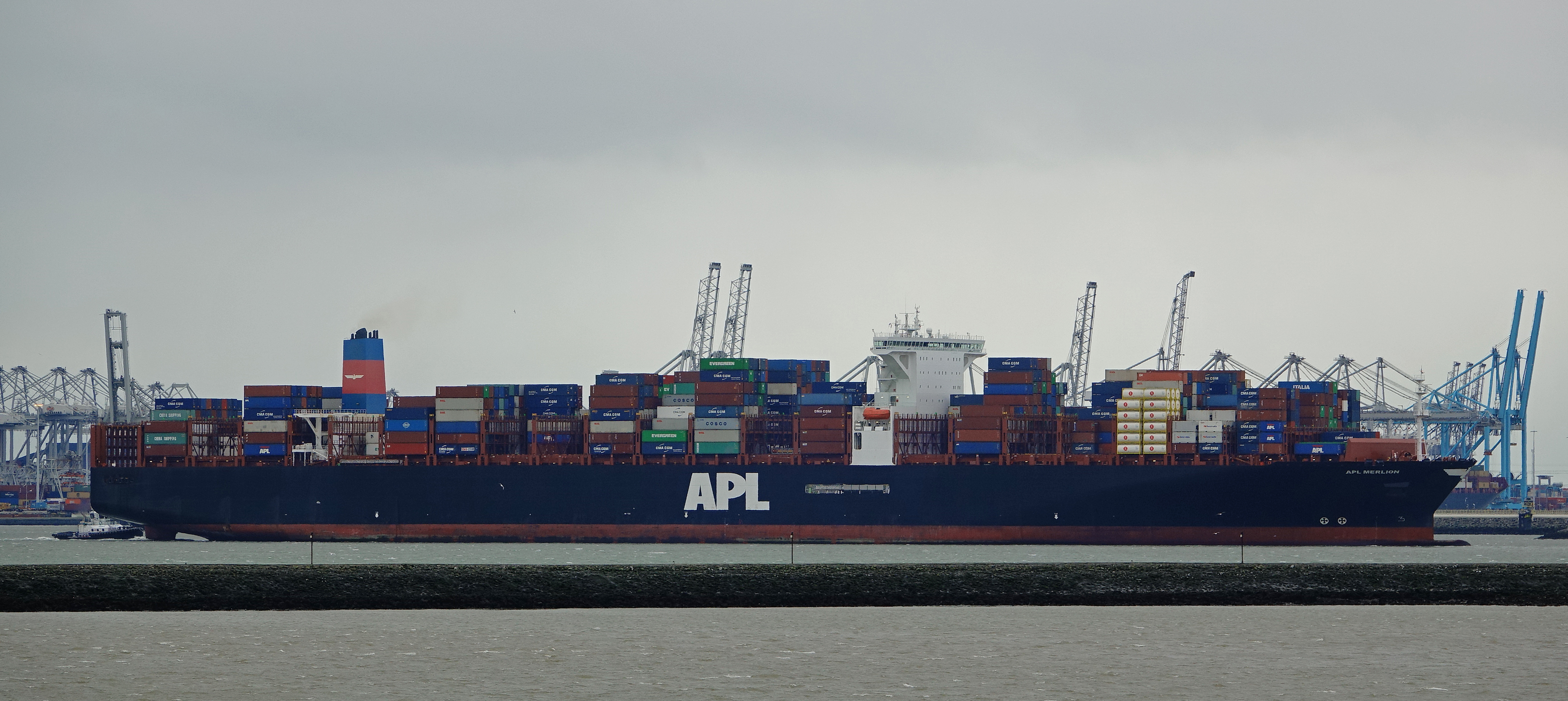
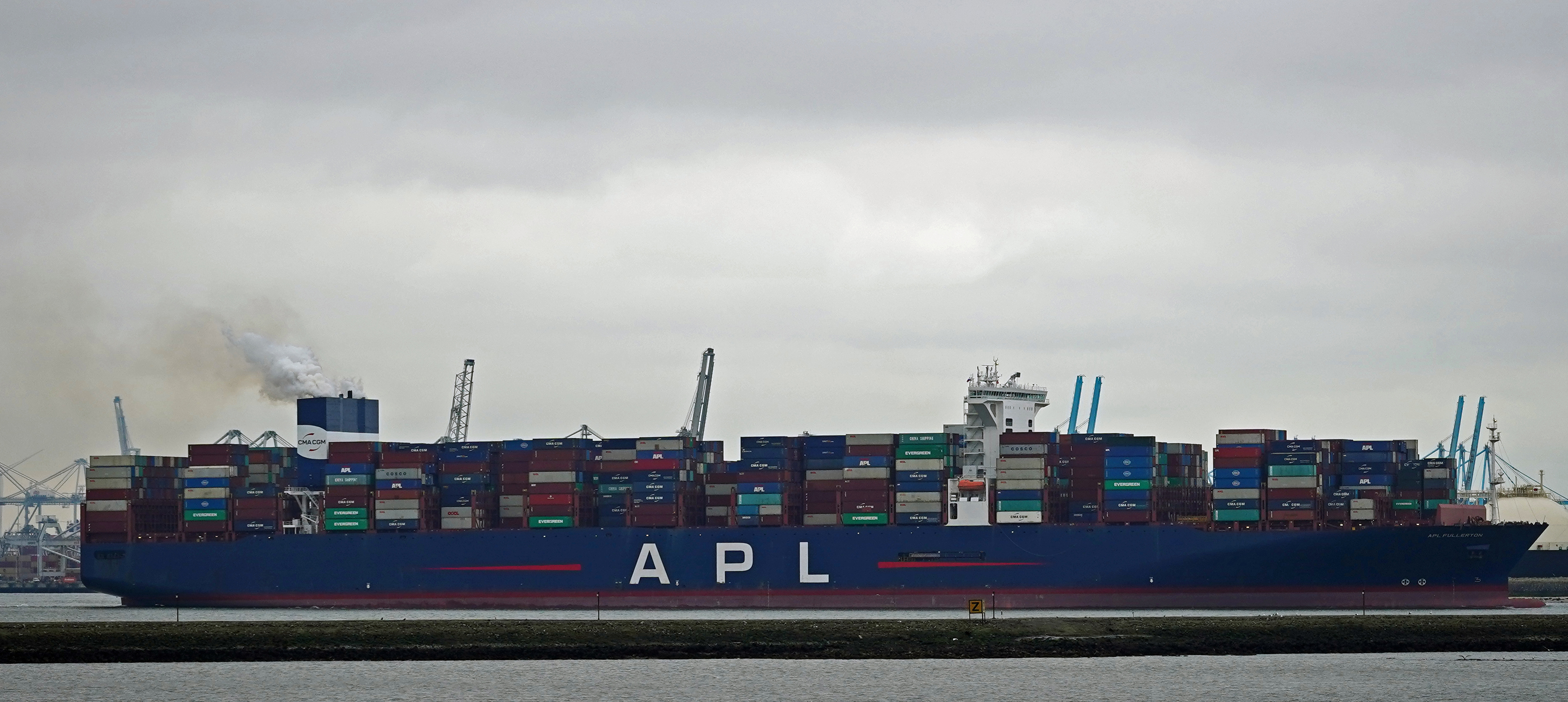
A visual comparison of ships before and after the upgrade

In 2018 and 2019, eight of the ships were modified at the Cosco Zhoushan Shipyard and CSIC Qingdao Beihai Shipyard in China. The ships were made longer by adding two extra container bays and the wheelhouse was raised so that the containers can be stacked higher on deck.

== List of ships ==
Ship	Previous names	Yard number	IMO number	Delivery	Status	Notes	ref
APL Temasek		S630	9631955	13 Mar 2013	In service	Upgraded	
APL Lion City	MOL Quest (2013-2017)	S631	9631967	10 Apr 2013	In service	Upgraded	
APL Raffles		S632	9631979	20 May 2013	In service	Upgraded	
APL Changi	MOL Quality (2013-2015)	S633	9631981	26 Jun 2013	In service	Upgraded	
APL Vanda		S634	9631993	22 Jul 2013	In service	Upgraded	
APL Singapura	MOL Quartz (2013-2017)	S635	9632002	10 Sep 2013	In service	Upgraded	
APL Merlion		S636	9632014	15 Feb 2014	In service	Upgraded	
APL Fullerton	MOL Quasar (2014-2017)	S637	9632026	15 Mar 2014	In service	Upgraded	
APL Esplanade	MOL Quintet (2014-2017)	S638	9632038	10 Apr 2014	In service		
APL Sentosa		S639	9632040	22 Apr 2014	In service		
