= MV Wan Hai 165 =

Container ship

History
- Name: Wan Hai 165
- Owner: (Taiwan) Wan Hai Lines
- Port of registry: Singapore
- Completed: 1998
- Identification: IMO number: 9158850; MMSI number: 565128000; Callsign: S6EN7
- Fate: Sold for recycling in January 2023

General characteristics
- Class & type: 160-type Container ship
- Tonnage: 13,246 GT
- Length: 160 m (524 ft 11 in)
- Beam: 25 m (82 ft 0 in)
- Draught: 7.2 m (23 ft 7 in)
- Speed: 11.4 kn
- Capacity: 1,088 TEU

MV Wan Hai 165 was a Singapore-flagged container ship owned by the Taiwanese shipping company Wan Hai Lines. The ship had a gross tonnage of 13,246 GT, a deadweight tonnage of 17,717 DWT, and could carry 1,088 TEU containers. It had a length of 160 m (520 ft), a width of 25 m (82 ft), and an average draft of 7.2 m (24 ft).

== History ==
In December 2022, Wan Hai Lines put up ten of its older container ships up for sale for scrap in order to reduce the size of its fleet, including Wan Hai 165. Part of the contract for potential buyers stipulated that they would be required to send the ships to scrapyards that met the company's environmental standards. Wan Hai 165 was sold to Elegant Exit Company in the Netherlands and departed on its final transit on 22 January 2023. It arrived in Bahrain on 30 January to begin the process of scrapping and recycling. After receiving approval from the Bahraini environmental authority, all hazardous materials will be removed from the ship and the metal will be systematically cut into twenty-five ton pieces for transport to external recycling facilities. As of October 2023, the ship was in the process of being dismantled in a dry dock in Bahrain.
