= CCGS Shark =

History

Canada
- Name: Shark
- Operator: Canadian Coast Guard
- Builder: Hike Metals & Shipbuilding Limited of Wheatley, Ontario
- Commissioned: 1971
- Decommissioned: 2009
- In service: 1971-2009
- Refit: 1997-1998 - new engines
- Home port: Burlington, Ontario

General characteristics
- Class & type: Inland Waters II
- Type: Near-shore Fishery Research Vessel
- Displacement: 29.82 grt
- Length: 16 m (52 ft 6 in)
- Beam: 4.5 m (14 ft 9 in)
- Draft: 1.2 m (3 ft 11 in)
- Propulsion: Diesel - 2 × Caterpillar 3126 - 6 cyl
- Speed: 14 knots (26 km/h)
- Range: 200 nmi (370 km)
- Endurance: 1.5 day
- Complement: 2

The CCGS Shark was a research vessel employed by the Canadian Coast Guard. She was employed on the North American Great Lakes. Shark was built by Hike Metals & Shipbuilbing Limited of Wheatley, Ontario. She was a converted tugboat commissioned into the Coast Guard in 1971.

She was retired in late 2009 and sold as surplus April 2011 for $160,000

== See also ==
- CCGS Kelso - Shark's replacement
