= American President Lines =

Logistics and shipping company

American President Lines, LLC

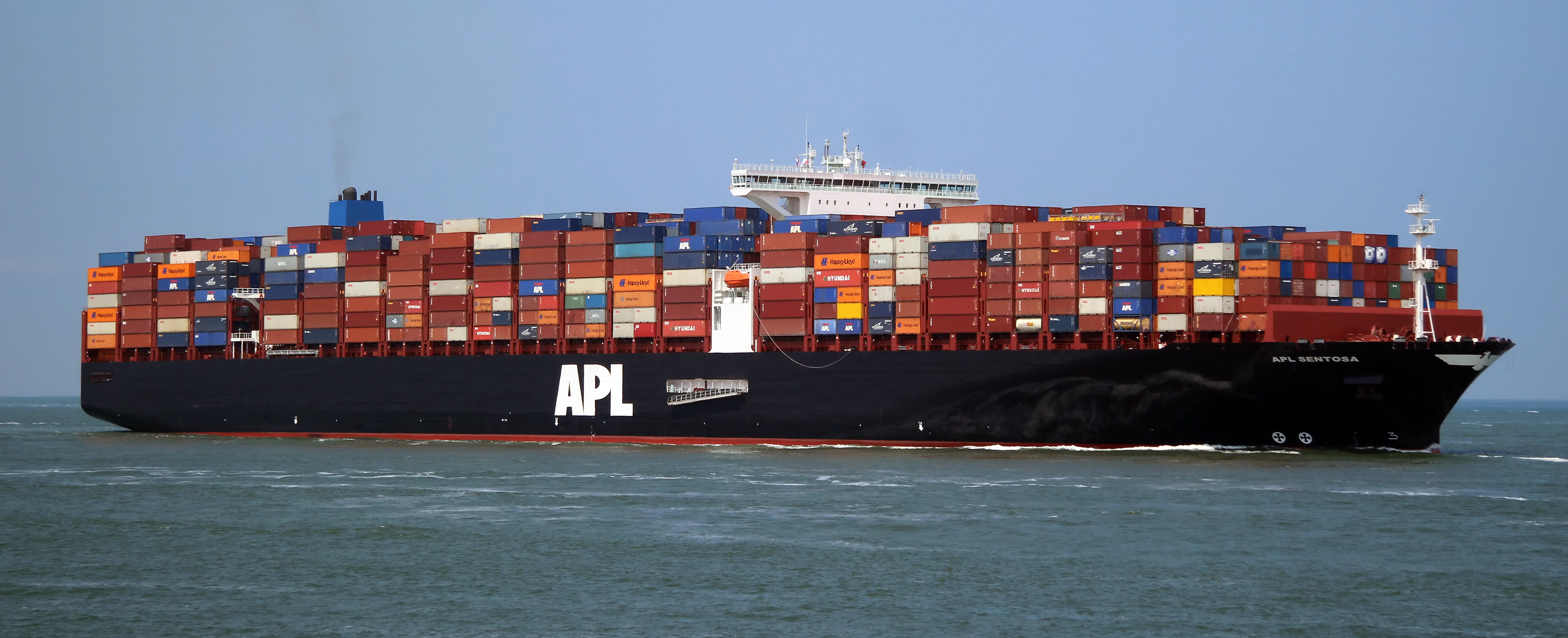
- Type: Subsidiary
- Industry: Container shipping
- Founded: 1848; 178 years ago in New York City, United States
- Founder: William Henry Aspinwall
- Headquarters: Arlington, Virginia, United States
- Area served: Worldwide
- Key people: George Goldman - President
- Services: Container Shipping; Terminals
- Revenue: US$ 4.6 billion (FY 2016)
- Number of employees: 5,000 (2017)
- Parent: CMA CGM
- Website: apl.com

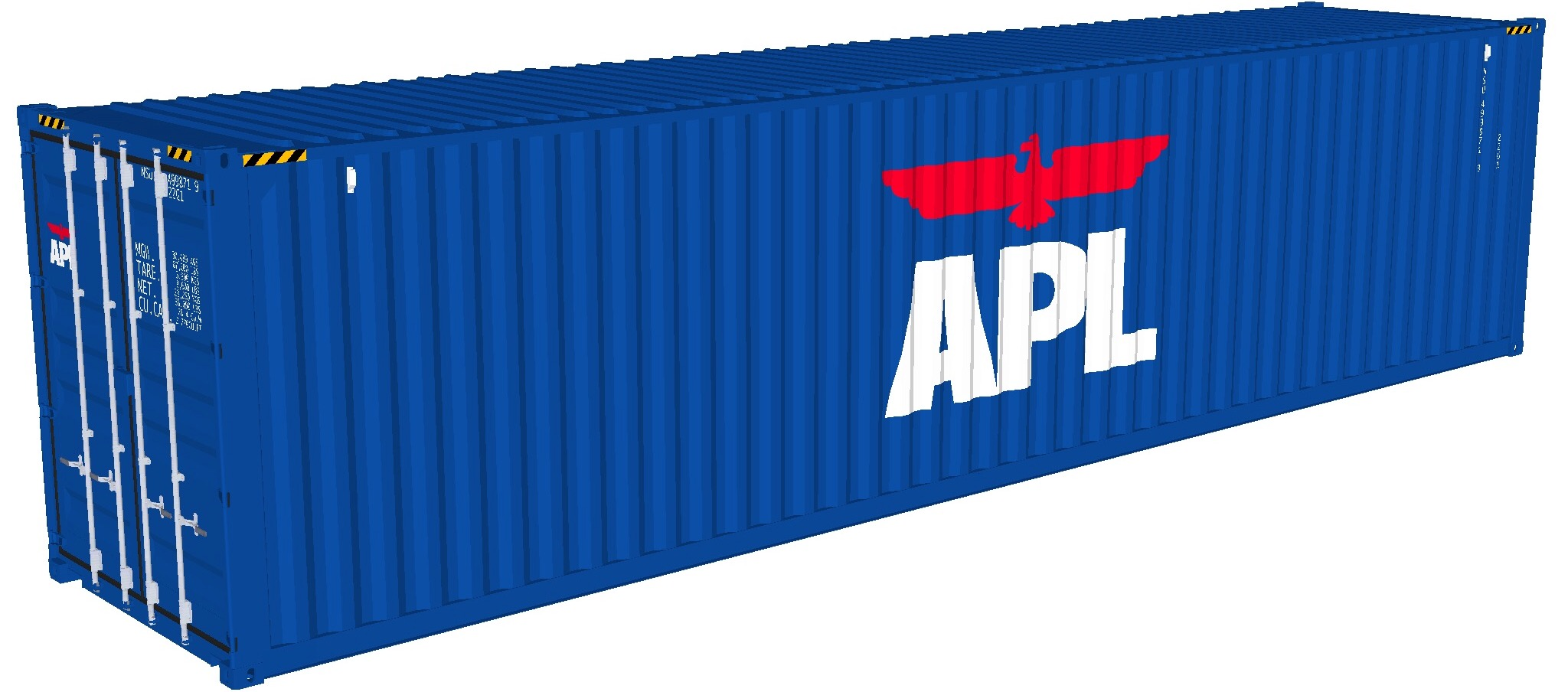
A 40 ft APL container.

American President Lines, LLC (APL) is an American container shipping company that is a subsidiary of French shipping company CMA CGM. It operates an all-container ship fleet, including eleven U.S. flagged container vessels.

In 1938, the U.S. government took over the management of the Dollar Steamship Co., which was in financial difficulties and transferred their assets to the newly formed American President Lines. In 1997, Singaporean shipping company Neptune Orient Lines (NOL) acquired APL, eventually moving APL's headquarters to Singapore. In 2016, CMA CGM acquired NOL, parent company of APL.

== History ==
=== Pacific Mail Steamship Company ===
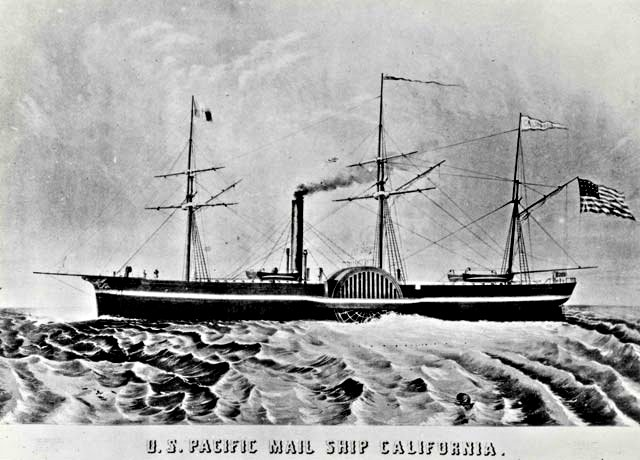
SS California, Pacific Mail's first ship, that departed New York almost empty, before being filled with hopeful gold miners heading for California Gold Rush starting in 1848.

Following the end of the Mexican–American War in 1848, the West Coast of the United States then extended from Puget Sound to San Diego. When the 29th United States Congress passed the Mail Steamer Bill (1847), mail delivery was authorized to be routed by ship from the East Coast of the United States to the Pacific Coast via the Isthmus of Panama, with two steamship routes operating: New York City to Chagres, Colombia on the Eastern side of the isthmus, and then a second route from Panama City, Colombia, to Astoria, Oregon. That same year, William Henry Aspinwall secured a 10-year government contract through Arnold Harris, with the Pacific Mail Steamship Company incorporating in the state of New York with a capital of $400,000, of which Aspinwall was elected the first president. This company was to move the mail from Panama to the West Coast, being paid $199,000 per annum by the U.S. government. In January 1848, the company ordered three mail steamers from the shipyard of William Henry Webb: the SS California, SS Panama and SS Oregon. On October 5 or October 6, 1848 the Pacific Mail's first of these steamers, the SS California, departed from New York City to run service from Panama to the West Coast, traveling around Cape Horn to San Francisco—coincidentally, the California Gold Rush began in January of that year, and the steamer—and its sisters, Oregon and Panama—took on many hopeful miners en route.

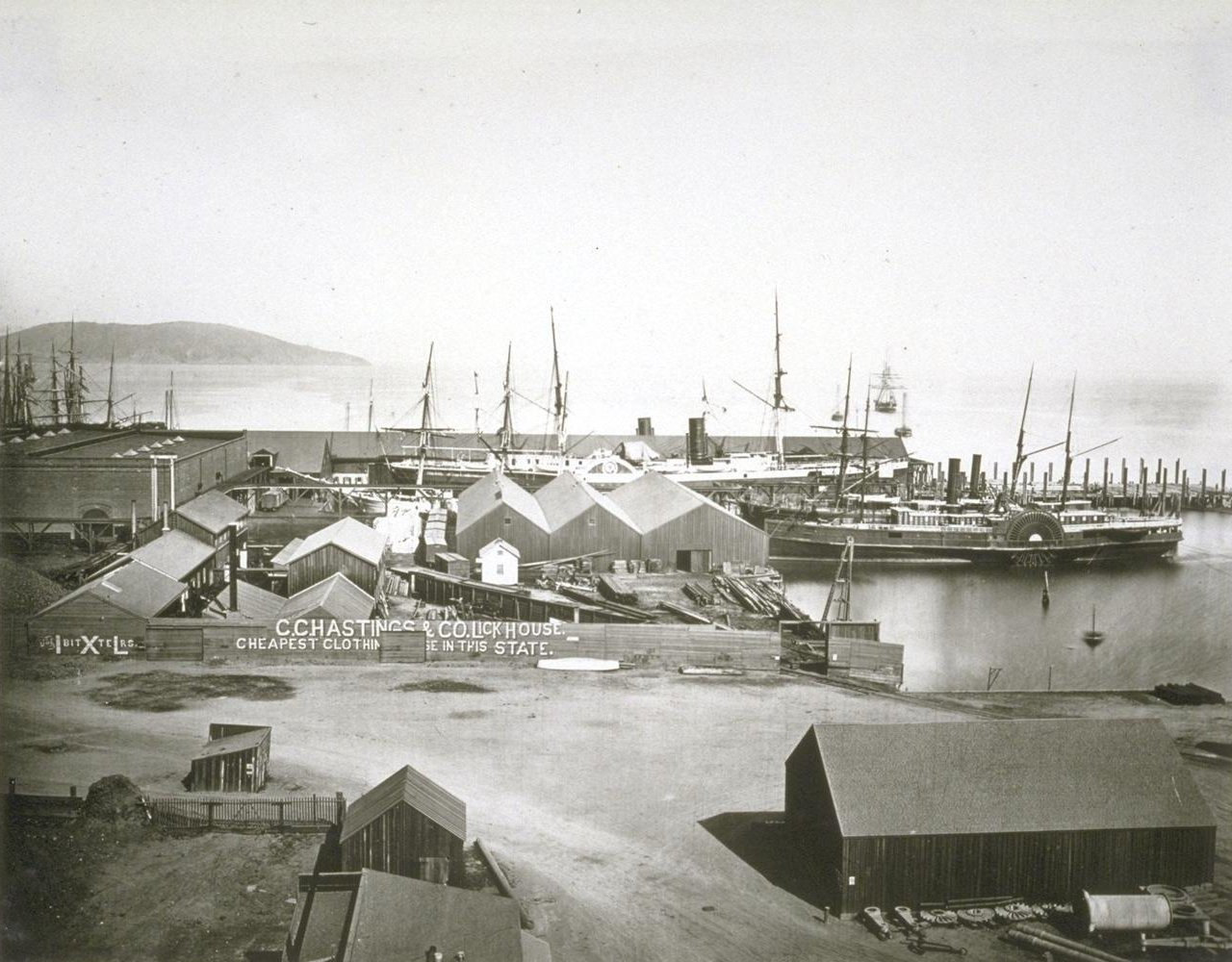
The Pacific Mail docks in San Francisco, circa 1860s. Two steamships are shown, both of which are in Trans-Pacific service at the time.

Prior to founding Pacific Mail, Aspinwall had extensive experience in the shipping business as a partner in Howland & Aspinwall. Howland & Aspinwall operated some of the most famous clipper ships ever built. In 1845, while it already owned the Ann McKim, which was regarded as the fastest ship afloat, the firm built the Rainbow, which was even faster. The Rainbow is considered to be the first of the extreme clippers, which were the racehorses of the sea. The next year, the company had the Sea Witch built, which set a speed record from China to New York that still stands.

Clipper ships sacrificed cargo capacity for speed, but in some markets, the fast service allowed their owners to charge premium rates (e.g. tea from China tasted better if it was fresh, so the cargo on the first ship of the season to arrive in New York was worth more). Also, faster speed meant that the vessel could complete more voyages in a given time period, which compensated for the diminished cargo capacity.

When in 1850, the Pacific Mail Steamship Company established a competing line to the U.S. Mail Steamship Company between New York City and Chagres, George Law placed an opposition Pacific Line of steamers (SS Antelope, SS Columbus, SS Isthmus, SS Republic) in the Pacific running from Panama City to San Francisco. In April 1851 the rivalry was ended when an agreement was made between the companies, the U.S. Mail Steamship Company purchased the Pacific Mail steamers on the Atlantic side (SS Crescent City, SS Empire City, SS Philadelphia), and George Law sold his ships and new line to the Pacific Mail.

By 1850, Pacific Mail maintained a monopoly over the Panama-Oregon trade, helped by the purchase of two steamers from Empire City Line. Large numbers of prospective gold miners paying for passage to California had meant that by 1850, the capital of Pacific Mail had increased from $400,000 to over $2 million. Pacific Mail also ordered four new ships, designed to meet the needs of trade to and from California, and opened ship depots at Panama City and Benicia, California. Aspinwall invested in the Panama Railroad Company, which would replace old wagon trails across the Isthmus, cutting travel time from four days to four hours. In 1852, George Law went into partnership with Aspinwall and developed its eastern terminal next to the wharf at Aspinwall, Columbia, then sold his interest in 1853. This line was completed in 1855, and coordination between steamships and this line meant the travel time from San Francisco to New York was cut to 21 days.

In 1856, Aspinwall retired from the position of president of the Pacific Mail Company, with the former secretary, William H. Davidge, taking the presidency. Under his control, the company's capital doubled, to $4 million, but the major turning point of his presidency of the company was in 1858, when Pacific Mail's contract with the government expired. At the same time, the contract of the U.S. Mail Steamship Company also expired. This company had been providing the ships for the New York to Panama route and went out of business in 1859. A through service was deemed necessary (and profitable), and the company bought three new ships: the SS Adriatic, SS Atlantic and SS Baltic, all of which had formerly belonged to Collins Line. Competition from the other Atlantic steamship lines was fierce, however, and within a few years, the route on the Atlantic side was pulled.

During the American Civil War (1861–65), Pacific Mail used its steamers to transport gold to the East Coast to support the Northern cause. The company also received the SS Colorado, launched from the same shipyard as the SS California. By the end of the war (1865), under the new presidency, Pacific Mail purchased its competitor, Atlantic Mail Steamship Company, which at this point was providing service from New York to the Isthmus. This in turn meant that, at last, Pacific Mail was able to provide complete service from New York to the West Coast via the Isthmus, without competition.

In 1866, the Federal government of the United States awarded the first mail contract of $500,000 per annum between San Francisco and the Far East — namely Hong Kong via Japan and the Sandwich Islands (later known as the Hawaiian Islands)—to Pacific Mail. The SS Colorado was pulled from the original New York–San Francisco route to be used on the new route from San Francisco to China and Japan. The Colorado was outfitted with a mizzen mast and more coal storage for the voyage, and in 1867, became the first steamship to run a regular service across the Pacific Ocean, running from San Francisco to Yokohama, Japan and onward to Hong Kong. Pacific Mail also ordered four new ships to run on this route: the SS China, SS Japan, SS Great Republic and SS America. These ships were ordered at a cost of $1 million, and the capital of the company was increased to $20 million to cover this cost.

By 1867, the company was running four different lines:

1. The Atlantic Line, between New York and Aspinwall, Panama. This ran thrice monthly.
2. The Pacific Line, which linked with the Atlantic Line, which ran between Panama and San Francisco, stopping at Acapulco and Manzanillo. This route also ran thrice monthly, except for the latter, which ran once monthly.
3. The China Line, between San Francisco and Hong Kong, stopping at Yokohama. This ran once monthly. This linked with the Pacific Line.
4. The Shanghai Line, which ran between Yokohama and Shanghai, via Nagasaki. This also ran once monthly, linking with the China Line.

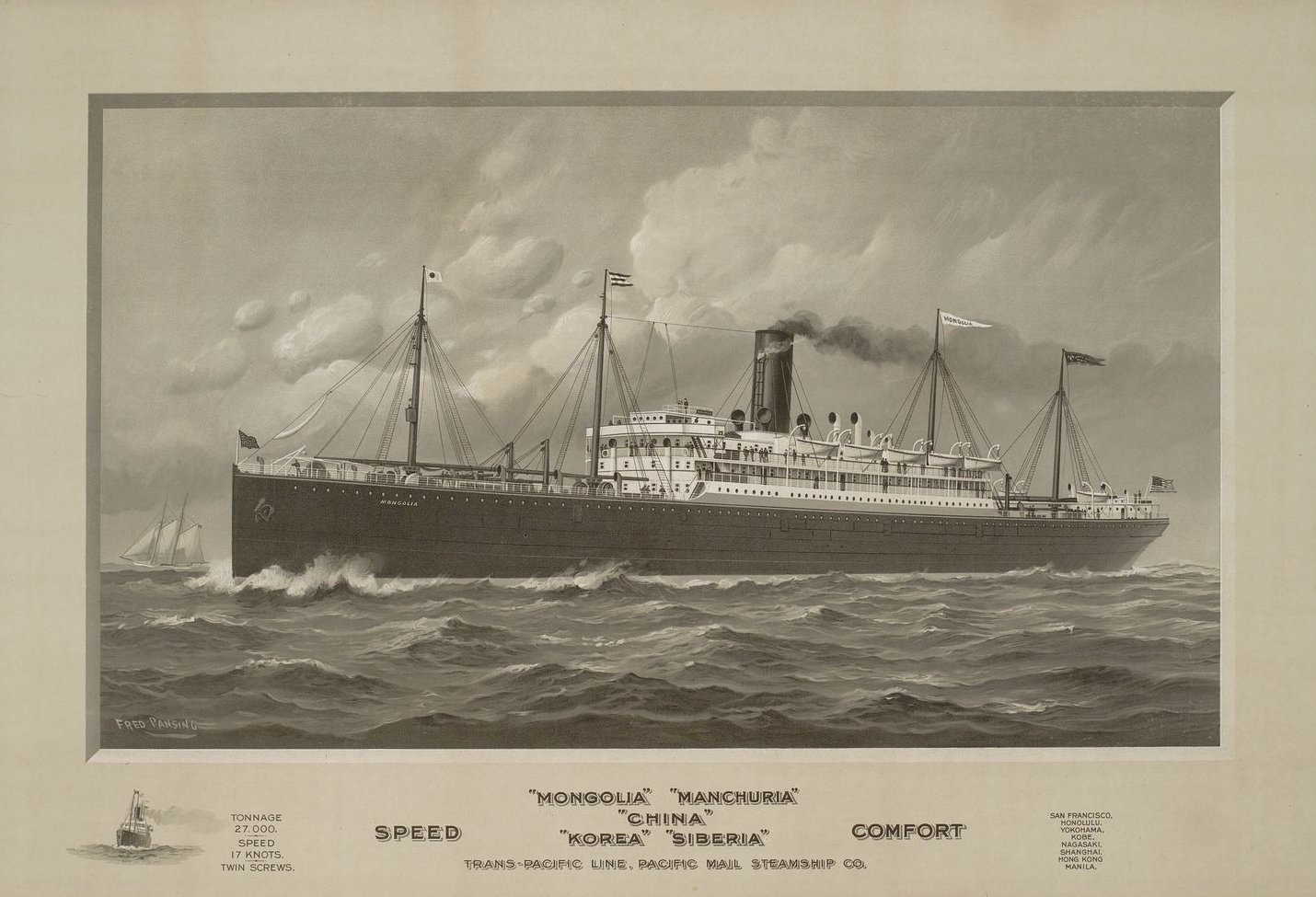
SS Mongolia, one of Pacific Mail's fastest and largest ships, is depicted on an advertisement for the company's trans-Pacific service.

Through these links, freight could be moved from New York to Yokohama in 42 days, to Shanghai in 47 days and Hong Kong in 50 days, including all detentions. In this same year, the company owned 25 ships, with a combined tonnage of 61,474 tons.

In 1869, the completion of the Transcontinental Railroad meant that the passenger traffic on the Panama route declined. In 1872, the U.S. government doubled the subsidy on mail transported by Pacific Mail, although it required the doubling of service and the modernization of the fleet. Therefore, in 1873, Pacific Mail took delivery of the first of 11 iron–hulled, screw-powered steamships, the City of Peking. In 1875, William Henry Aspinwall, died on January 18 at the age of 68, but Pacific Mail continued on, and soon began service to Australia and New Zealand.

During the 1880s Pacific Mail modernized its ships with steel hulls, replacing the old iron vessels, and installed electric lighting by Thomas Edison on the SS Columbia, making it the first ship to have electrical power in the world. In 1893, the Southern Pacific Co. acquired control over the Pacific Mail. In 1902, Pacific Mail launched the SS Korea and SS Siberia, which were its first steel-hulled ships, followed by SS Manchuria and SS Mongolia in 1904. These ships were the largest and fastest passenger-freight ships in the Pacific, the latter two measuring more than 13,600 gross tons, larger than any other ship the company owned at the time.

In 1912, Congress banned ships owned by railroads from using the Panama Canal, and so Pacific Mail was sold to W. R. Grace and Company, where it operated as a subsidiary from 1916 till 1925, when the company's trans-Pacific fleet was bought over by the Dollar Shipping Company for $5,625,000 in cash.

=== Dollar Shipping Company ===
Old house flag of Dollar Steamship Line

Meanwhile, Captain Robert Dollar purchased his first ship, marking the beginning of his shipping empire. Dollar was born in Falkirk, Scotland in 1844, moving to Canada at the age of 11, where he worked in a lumber camp. Following this, in 1893, he purchased his own sawmill on the Pacific Coast. Due to unreliable shipping timetables, he found it hard to ship his lumber from the Pacific Northwest down the coast towards California. Hence, in 1893 Dollar bought a 120-foot (37 m) steam schooner called Newsboy. This led to the establishment of the Dollar Steamship Company (commonly known as "Dollar Line") on August 12, 1900, which soon grew to have a large fleet of schooners transporting lumber to market.

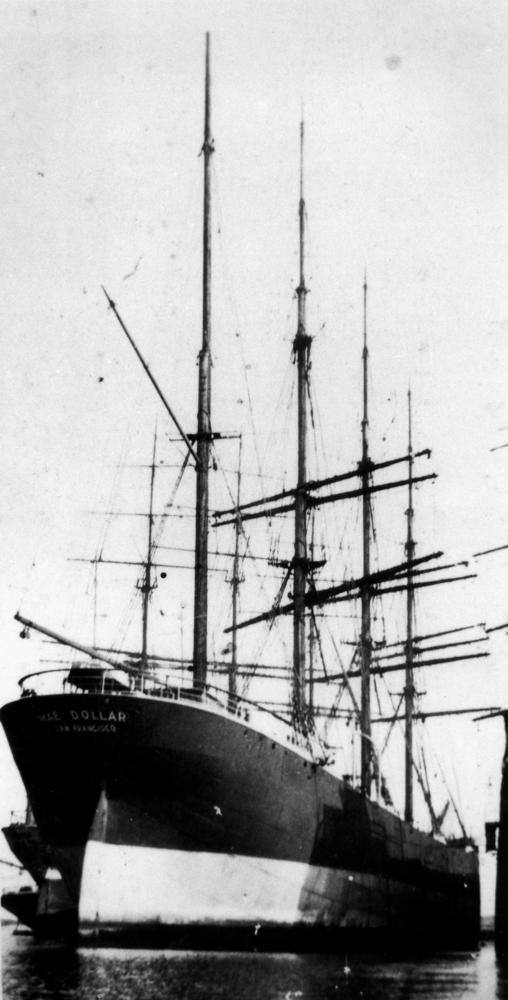
Mae Dollar

In 1902, Dollar sailed to Asia for the first time on a Pacific Mail ship, SS China, to prospect potential lumber markets on the other side of the Pacific. He began to acquire a number of ships, and began his trans-Pacific shipping with a chartered voyage to Yokohama, Japan and the Philippines, marking his entry into international shipping. During World War I, Dollar ordered the construction of $30 million worth of ships in China, and in 1923 bought seven "502 President Type" liners from the U.S. Shipping Board, pioneering his round-the-world service, marked by the departure of President Harrison on January 5, 1924. These were all named after U.S. presidents, a tradition that Dollar Shipping continued until its end.

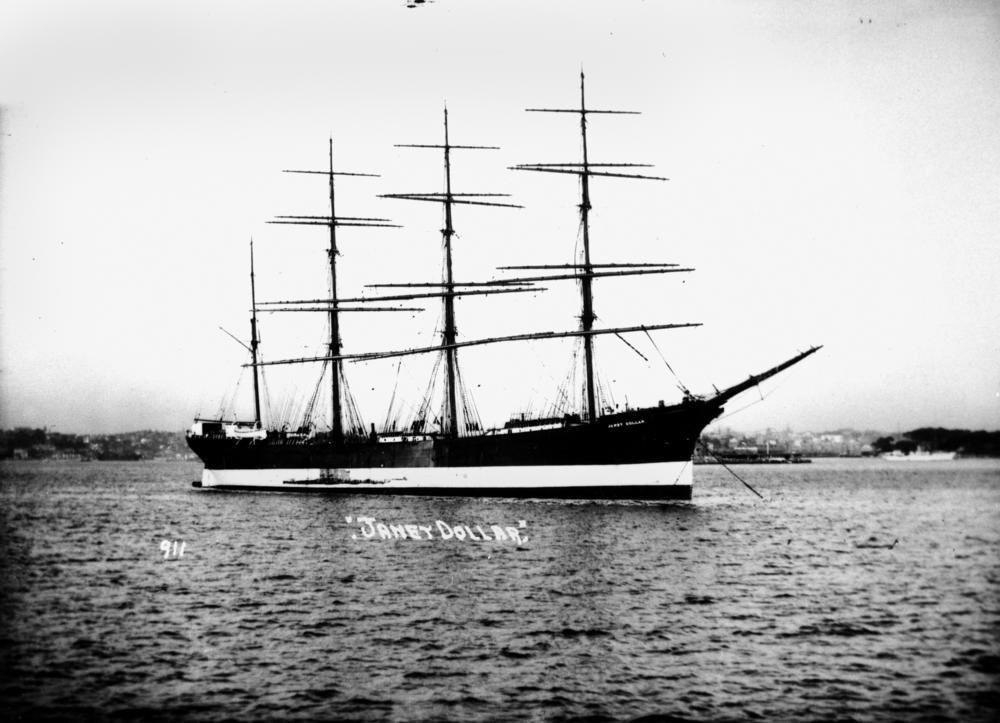
Janet Dollar

A Dollar Line "President 535" liner, from a 1926 brochure.

This was followed up in 1925 by the purchase of eight more "535 President Type" liners from the Shipping Board, which had previously been run by Pacific Mail. Dollar Shipping bid much lower than Pacific Mail for the ships—on the order of $1 million—but Pacific Mail's offer included stocks as well as cash. Thus, the Shipping Board declared that Pacific Mail was unable to meet the terms of tender, and awarded $30 million worth of ships to Dollar Shipping. This naturally caused troubles for Pacific Mail, and it was taken over by Dollar Shipping the same year, although Dollar had ordered his sons to begin buying stock of the company in 1920. In 1922 the Dollar Line also acquired the Admiral Oriental Line and renamed it the American Mail Line, making Dollar one of the most profitable shipping companies in the world.

Dollar Line continued expanding its business in the late 1920s, buying five more "535 President Type" ships in 1926. In that year, Dollar Line carried over 45,000 passengers and had a gross revenue of $6 million. Dollar encouraged others to invest in Asia with his booklet, "Have You Investigated the Oriental Market for Your Product?", helping to open up Asia to 20th-century industry. The Merchant Marine Act of 1928 (also known as the Jones–White act) also helped Dollar Line, allowing it to sign a lucrative new mail contract and requiring it to build new ships to meet demand.

On October 26, 1929, just as the Wall Street Crash of 1929 was beginning, Dollar Steamship Line (renamed that same year) ordered two 21,936-gross register ton (GRT) steam turbo-electric ocean liners—the largest yet built for a US shipping company. SS President Hoover was completed in 1930 and SS President Coolidge was completed in 1931. They were state-of-the-art, luxurious sister ships rivaling the best hotels of the era, but by then the Great Depression had deepened and the ships carried only half their capacity on their maiden voyages.

On May 16, 1932, Robert Dollar died at the age of 88 and was succeeded by his son, Robert Stanley Dollar. The company began a steady decline. The faltering Dollar companies were now faced with sharply increased operating costs. In December 1937 President Hoover ran aground off the east coast of Taiwan, and was written off as a constructive total loss. By 1938 The company was $7 million in debt, with interest increasing this by $80,000 per day. In June 1938 President Coolidge was arrested (seized under admiralty law) in San Francisco for a £35,000 unpaid debt.

=== American President Lines ===
Old House flag of American President Lines, adopted in 1938.

In August 1938, the United States Maritime Commission judged the Dollar Shipping Company unsound and assumed control over it, appointing William Gibbs McAdoo to succeed R. Stanley Dollar and Joseph R. Sheehan as the new president of the line. The first item of business was an amendment to the corporate charter, renaming the line as "American President Lines". American Mail Line was also sold to tobacco magnate Richard J. Reynolds and reorganized as an independent company. With that the Dollar Steamship, a long potent force in American shipping, became part of maritime history.

By 1940, the U.S. government had commissioned 16 new ships for APL, continuing the "president" naming of ships, one of these examples being SS President Jackson, a C-3 class merchant vessel. In 1941, the U.S. entered World War II, and in 1942 the War Shipping Administration was created, of which APL was an agent. APL worked on the management of some of the Administration's ships, maintaining and overhauling them as well as crewing them and being responsible for the handling of cargo and passengers. APL's own ships were used, in addition to the many Liberty and Victory ships that were built. In 1944, an additional 16 ships were built specifically for APL, including SS President Buchanan, a Victory class vessel. At the end of the war in 1945, the company's assets were valued at $40 million.

One of the APL ships in World War II still survives. SS Lane Victory is a Victory ship that is preserved as a museum ship in the San Pedro area of Los Angeles, California. As a rare surviving Victory ship, she is a U.S. National Historic Landmark. The Lane Victory was built by the California Shipbuilding Corporation in Los Angeles, California and launched on 31 May 1945.

In 1945, R. Stanley Dollar, son of Robert Dollar, initiated court proceedings in the form of the Dollar case, in an attempt to force the return of the company from the government to his family. This case would last seven years, ending with the 1952 privatization of APL by oil executive Ralph K. Davies, backed by Signal Oil and Gas, with 50% of the proceeds going to the Dollar family. the government continuing the operation of APL in the meantime. APL restarted its round-the-world passenger service, and launched the SS President Cleveland and SS President Wilson the next year, which were advertised as "your American hotel abroad." In the 1950s, the company again expanded, building more ships; 11 were built between 1952 and 1954. These included C-4 class cargo ships. Davies also acquired control of American Mail Line with the aim of reintegrating it into APL.

In 1958, the company began investigating the possibility of containerization, and sent research teams into 28 major ports. Following their reports, Davies began integrating containers into the company's business. By 1961, the company had begun launching ships capable of container transport, the first two of these being the combination break-bulk - container vessels SS President Tyler and SS President Lincoln. Ports also began adapting to the new container-based system, although many potential customers were still wary. By the end of the decade, the company was still launching combination ships rather than fully cellular container ships as already employed by several U.S., British, European and Japanese lines, yet by 1969, 23% of the company's business moved via container. In 1961, APL moved it headquarters to the newly constructed International Building at the intersection of California and Kearny Streets in San Francisco's financial district.

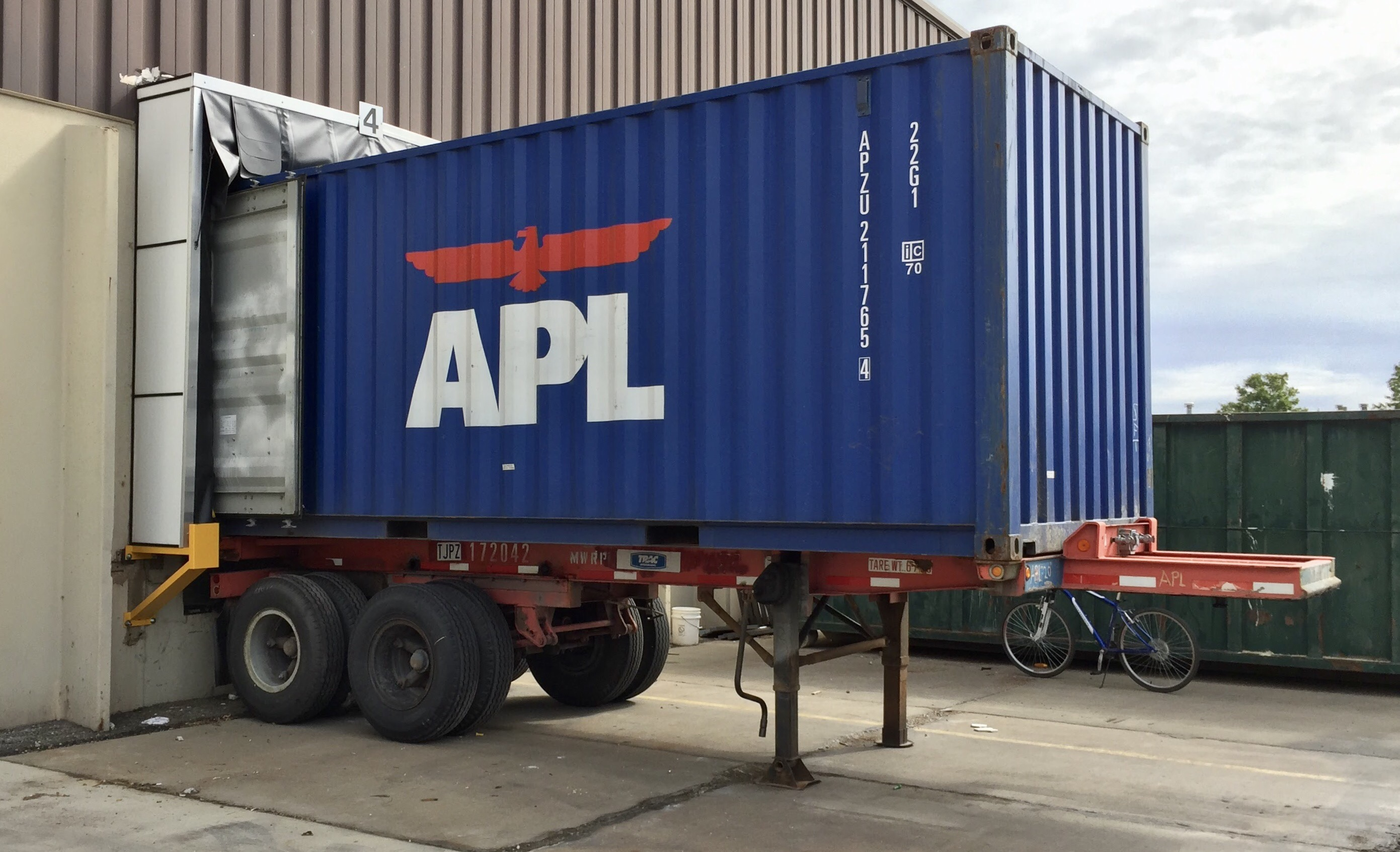
A 20 ft APL container mounted onto a chassis is parked at a warehouse loading dock in the United States.

The increasing use of air travel meant that the company's passenger services had steadily been declining throughout the 1960s, and by 1973, the last APL liner, the SS President Wilson, completed her final round-the-world trip and was sold off. Also in 1973, American Mail Line was fully absorbed into APL, and its ships were subsequently given traditional "President" names. By 1971, the use of containers had again increased; 58% of the company's business moved via container. During the early 1970s, the company converted many of its traditional break-bulk freight and combination ships into more efficient container-only ships, and ordered four new-built container ships. In 1977, however, the line pulled back from worldwide freight service to focus on purely trans-Pacific routes. In 1978, the company began work on the concept of seamless integrated intermodal service in the U.S. market: the idea of moving containerized goods via ship, train and truck under one company identity. By 1979, APL started the LinerTrain, a direct rail land-bridge service transporting containers from Los Angeles to New York using its own rail cars, leading to the most reliable delivery of containers of the time. At the same time, the company built its three largest vessels to date: three C-9 class diesel-powered container ships, the first of which was the President Lincoln.

In 1984, the company started StackTrain service, an idea following on from the successful LinerTrain venture. This involved using double-stack rail cars that could carry containers stacked one on top of another rather than carrying just a single level of containers. Each rail car had a well that held the bottom container, thereby lowering the two stacked containers to reduce their combined height to fit within rail line clearances, hence the common name for double stack cars: "well cars." Double-stacking containers in well cars was developed in the late 1970s and first deployed in 1981, but APL was the first shipping line to fully embrace and exploit the concept. APL's cars were developed and manufactured by Thrall Car, while line-haul rail service was initially provided by the Union Pacific Railroad and Chicago and North Western Railway, and eventually by Conrail once track clearances were enlarged.

Double-stacking containers greatly improved operating efficiency by reducing train length and the number of axles per container, thus saving fuel per ton-mile. Another benefit was created by permanently joining five cars in a set. This reduced the number of couplers, which reduced slack action. Slack is created in any train by the couplers between the cars being stretched and compressed, and in long, heavy trains this can be quite a powerful force. By reducing slack action, the damage caused to the freight transported in containers is also reduced.

At the same time, the company continued to modernize its fleet, with ever-larger and faster ships, all of which were outfitted for container transport. APL also started a door-to-door service, known as the Red Eagle service. Another initiative was to introduce larger container sizes: 45-foot (14 m) containers in 1982, 48-foot (15 m) containers in 1985 and 53-foot (16 m) containers in 1988. Also in 1988, the company developed post-Panamax vessels, those too large to transit the Panama Canal. These ships were 903 feet (275 m) long and 129 feet (39 m) wide, with the ability to carry 4,300 TEUs, a TEU being an arbitrary container unit 20 feet (6.1 m) long. All these developments led APL to be declared an industry leader in 1989, with the award of the "Admiral of the Ocean Sea Award" by the United Seamen's Service to the president, W. Bruce Seaton.

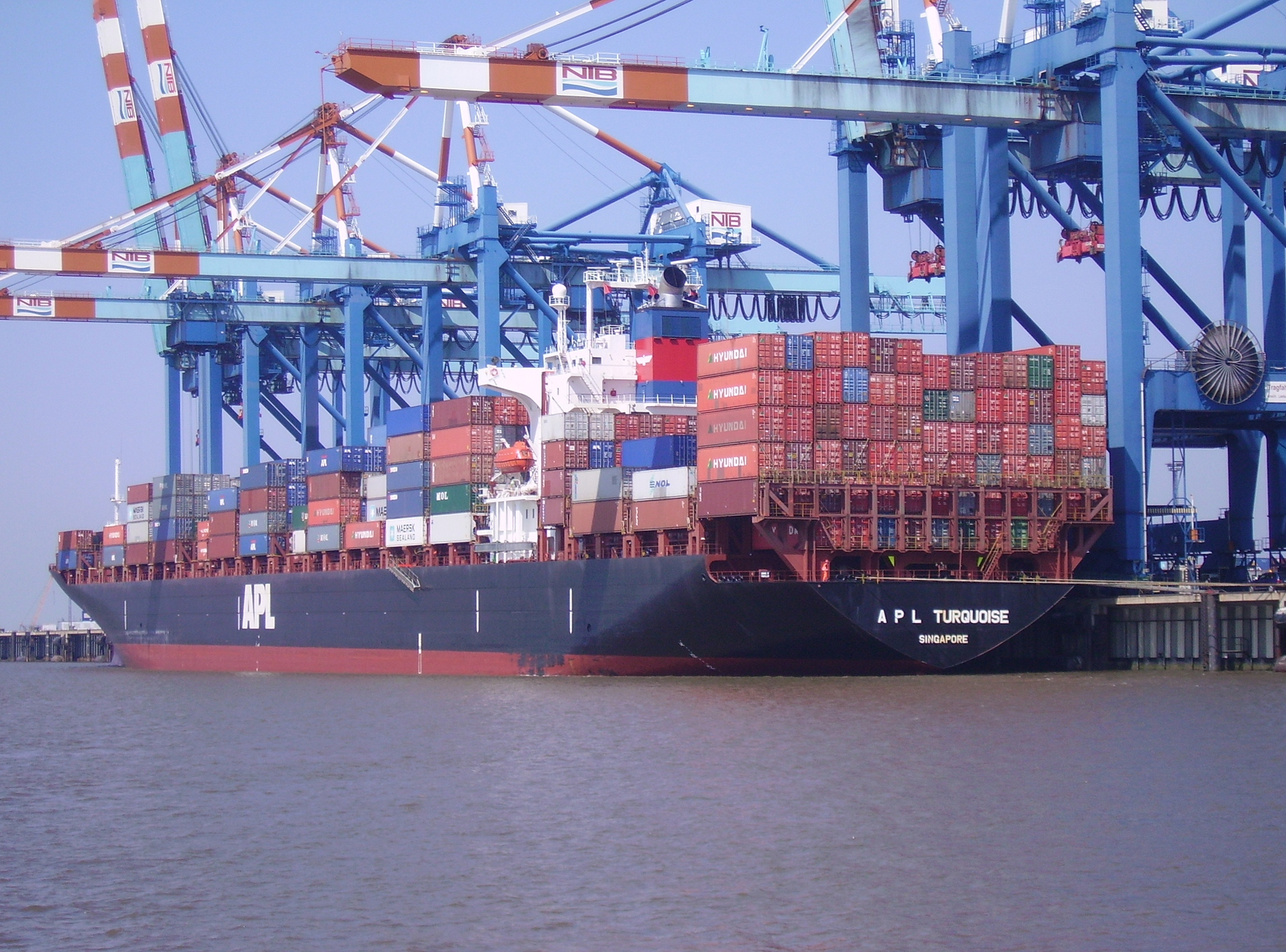
Container ship APL Turquoise is moored in Bremerhaven, Germany.

The 1990s were a period of continued growth for APL. It still clung to the tradition of naming ships after U.S. presidents, and it had a fleet of 20 fully containerized ships at this point with a combined capacity of 20,000 TEUs. In 1990, APL had a special request for Union Pacific 3985 to pull a 143-car doublestack train between Cheyenne, Wyoming and North Platte, Nebraska. In 1991, APL started stack train service from Chicago to Mexico, serving Chrysler auto plants, as well as providing general service. The company also invested heavily in information technology, using this to keep track of its ever-growing fleet of trains, containers and ships. This has been continually upgraded ever since.

In 1993, the company continued to increase its revenues, and entered a 30-year agreement with the Port of Los Angeles to open a new terminal, at a cost of $70 million. The next year, it almost doubled the size of its Seattle terminal as well, increasing it from 83 acres (340,000 m^{2}) to 160. The company became the first shipper to open a website in 1995, and offered online shipment transactions. In 1997, the company was bought by Neptune Orient Lines for $285 million, at a cost of $33.50 per share. In 1998, the APL vessel APL CHINA encountered a storm south of the Aleutian Islands. The losses to the cargo, with 388 containers going overboard and many others damaged as well as damage to the ship, initiated $50 million in lawsuit claims against APL. This may have been the largest maritime shipping loss in history.

In 1999, the stack train franchise was sold off to Pacer, and is now known as Pacer Stacktrain. In the new millennium, the company's business began to falter. In 2001, parent company NOL reported losses of $57 million, followed by an amazing loss of $330 million in 2002. At this same time, APL's sales dropped from $3.8 billion in 2000 to $3.4 billion in 2002. Acting CEO Ron Widdows began a campaign of cost cutting and sped up decision making, and since 2003, the company has been making money again. In 2005, the company introduced the "Real-Time Locating System" using RFID tags, which accurately recorded the position of every container within the system, reducing delays and lost containers—APL's Global Gateway South terminal in Los Angeles now moves 1.65 million TEUs annually.

In 2009, APL and other Neptune Orient business moved to a new headquarters in Singapore. Previously, APL had been based in Oakland, California.

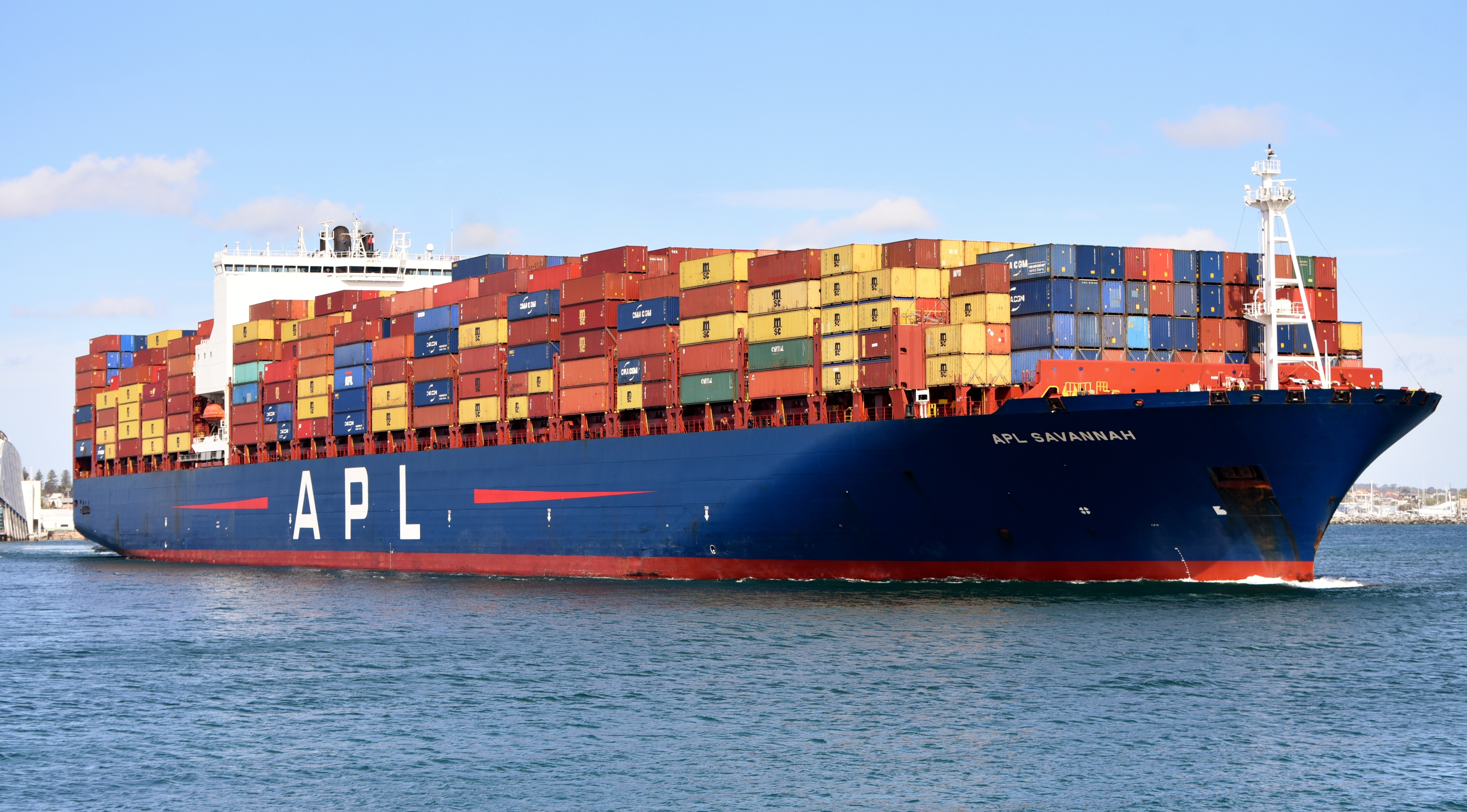
Container ship APL Savannah is seen departing from Fremantle, Australia.

On June 10, 2016, APL and NOL became subsidiaries of CMA-CGM when over 90% of NOL stocks were purchased by the container line. Later that year, CMA CGM subsidiary U.S. Lines as well as the transpacific business of ANL was consolidated into APL.

In November 2016, the Hong Kong Customs and Excise Department seized a shipment of nine Terrex APC vehicles, along with other equipment, belonging to the Singapore Armed Forces at the Kwai Tsing Container Terminal (formerly Kwai Chung Container Terminal). The shipment was seized because APL, which had been engaged by the Singapore military to handle the shipment, did not have the appropriate permits for the vehicles and equipment. In January 2017, it was announced that Hong Kong Customs would be returning the military equipment to Singapore, and that APL would be working with the Hong Kong authorities to ship the vehicles and related equipment back to Singapore. Commissioner of the Customs and Excise Department, Roy Tang Yun-kwong, added that APL would likely face criminal charges for breaching Hong Kong Law in this incident. In 2019, American President Lines and the captain of the involved ship was charged with violating the Import and Export (Strategic Commodities) Regulations, which they both pleaded not guilty to. In April 2019, they were found guilty, with American President Lines sentenced to 90,000 HKD in fines (10,000 HKD for each vehicle), and the captain sentenced to 9,000 HKD in fines (1,000 HKD for each vehicle) and 3 months of jail time (suspended for 1.5 years).

In January 2017, container ship APL Denver collided with Wan Hai 301, a ship belonging to Singapore, off Pasir Gudang Port in Johor, Malaysia. The accident occurred because APL Denver had crossed the path of Wan Hai 301 while it was moving through the separation scheme. APL Denver was heavily damaged, with at least 300 tonnes of oil spilled into the water near Pasir Gudang Port.

Since October 2020, APL has focused exclusively on U.S. Government business - leaving CMA CGM as the sole brand in the transpacific.

== Terminals ==
APL operates marine terminals at ten strategic points around the world.

- Americas – Dutch Harbor (Alaska)
- Asia – Kaohsiung (Taiwan), Kobe (Japan), Yokohama (Japan), Ho Chi Minh City (Vietnam), Laem Chabang (Thailand), Qingdao (China), Nhava Sheva (India)

== Fleet ==
Container ship classes of APL
Ship class	Built	Capacity (TEU)	Ships in class	Notes
Temasek-class	2013–2014	13,892	10	

== See also ==
- List of largest container shipping companies
- Nippon Yusen (NYK Line) - Formerly a Japanese steamship operator which had transpacific services
- Mitsui O.S.K. Lines - Formerly a Japanese steamship operator which had transpacific services
