= CCGS S. Dudka =

Canadian fishery protection vessel

History

Canada
- Name: S. Dudka
- Namesake: Stanley Dudka
- Operator: Canadian Coast Guard
- Port of registry: Ottawa, Ontario
- Builder: ABCO Industries Lunenburg Shipyard, Lunenburg, Nova Scotia
- Launched: March 22, 2013
- Commissioned: July 11, 2013
- Home port: Summerside, Prince Edward Island
- Identification: Official number: 837280; MMSI number: 316002000; Callsign: CFN6367
- Status: in active service

General characteristics
- Type: Specialty vessel
- Tonnage: 31.2 GT; 23.4 NT
- Length: 14.6 m (47 ft 11 in)
- Beam: 5.1 m (16 ft 9 in)
- Draft: 0.8 m (2 ft 7 in)
- Propulsion: 2 × Volvo Penta D13-700 diesel engines
- Speed: 21 knots (39 km/h) (cruising speed); 32 knots (59 km/h) (maximum speed)
- Endurance: 1 day
- Complement: 3

CCGS S. Dudka is fishery protection vessel of the Canadian Coast Guard. She was built in Lunenburg, Nova Scotia, for $2.9 million CAD. She was launched on March 22, 2013. She was officially commissioned on July 11, 2013. Twenty-five descendants of Stanley Dudka, the ship's namesake, attended the commissioning. Dudka was a decorated veteran of World War II.
