= Cap San Lorenzo =

Container ship

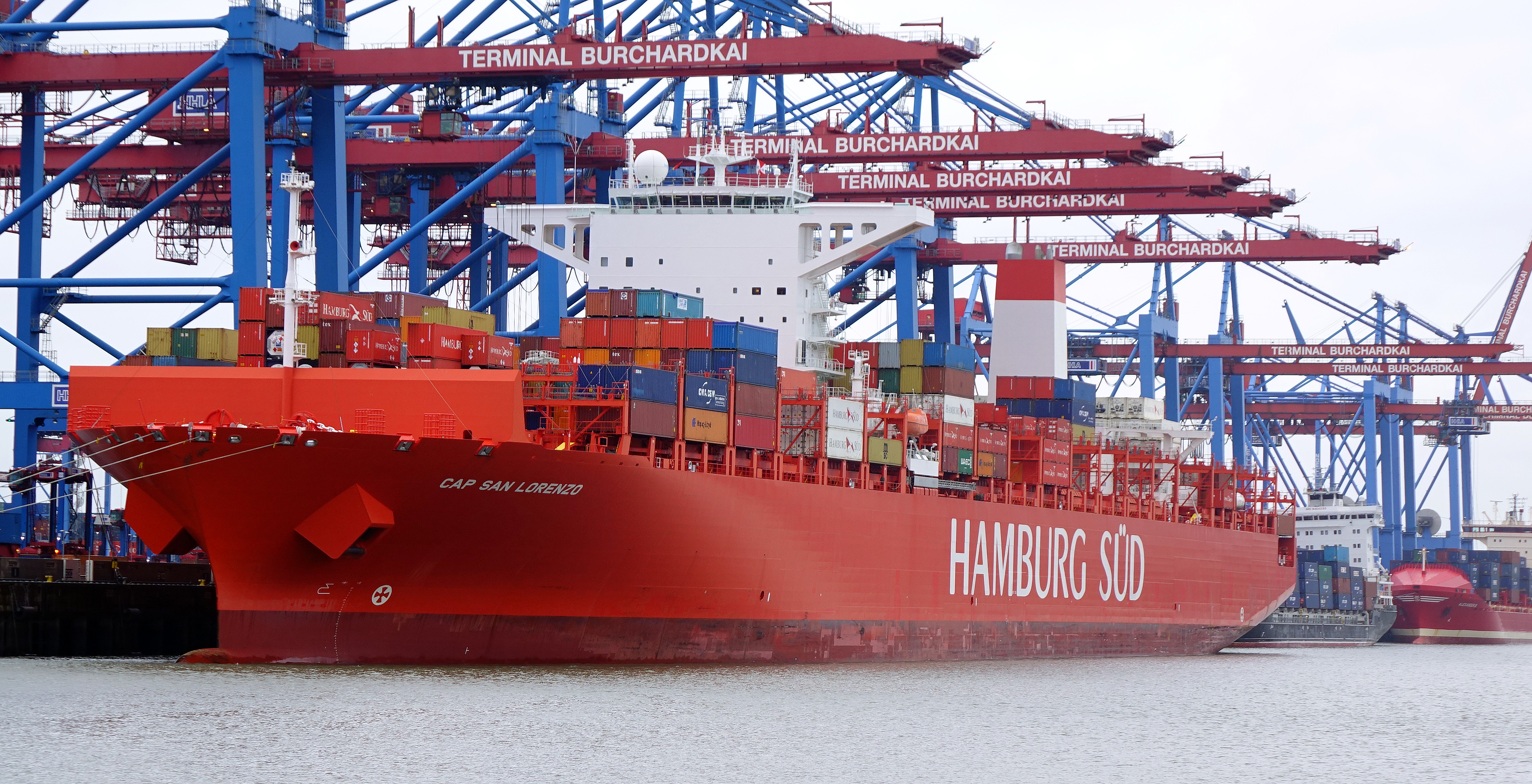
- Cap San Lorenzo in 2013

History

Portugal
- Name: Cap San Lorenzo
- Owner: Maersk
- Operator: Hamburg Süd
- Port of registry: Portugal
- Launched: 16 October 2013
- Identification: Call sign: CQEV; IMO number: 9622227; MMSI number: 255805699
- Status: In service

General characteristics
- Length: 333 m (1,092 ft 6 in)
- Beam: 48 m (157 ft 6 in)
- Draught: 12.3 m (40 ft 4 in)
- Depth: 32.50 m (106 ft 8 in) (deck edge to keel)

Cap San Lorenzo is a container ship based out of Portugal. It was built in 2013 and is operated by Hamburg Süd.

== Operational history ==
On the morning of April 23, 2015, Cap San Lorenzo ran aground near Flushing, Netherlands, in the North Sea on a sandbar while en route from Antwerp to Le Havre. Initial attempts to refloat the Cap San Lorenzo failed due to fog and low tide. A second attempt with the aid of four tugs was successful later on April 23. No reports of injuries to the 29 crew on board, as well as no damage or pollution released. Cap San Lorenzo proceeded to an anchorage off Ostend where divers conducted a survey before allowing the vessel to proceed on its voyage. The vessel arrived at Le Havre, France, without incident.

On December 5, 2016, 225 kilograms (496 lb) of cocaine was found on board prior to leaving Santos, Brazil. The container was located with chocolates, which was to be sent to Rotterdam, Netherlands. It is unclear whether the drugs were smuggled into the container while on board the vessel or when the container was at port. The Cap San Lorenzo remained in port in Brazil until December 7 while the investigation continued. As of February 2018 no arrests had been made pertaining to the case.
