= ABCO Industries =

Shipyard in Nova Scotia, Canada

ABCO Industries is located on the waterfront of the UNESCO World Heritage Site-designated port town of Lunenburg, Nova Scotia.

The shipyard was founded in 1947 on the site of the World War II Norwegian military training facility Camp Norway. Today it manufactures welded marine-grade aluminum boats, ranging from 16 feet (5 m) up to 65 feet (20 m) in length, to both custom-made and standardized designs. Its 26,000 square feet (2,415 m^{2}) facility includes 3D modeling capabilities.

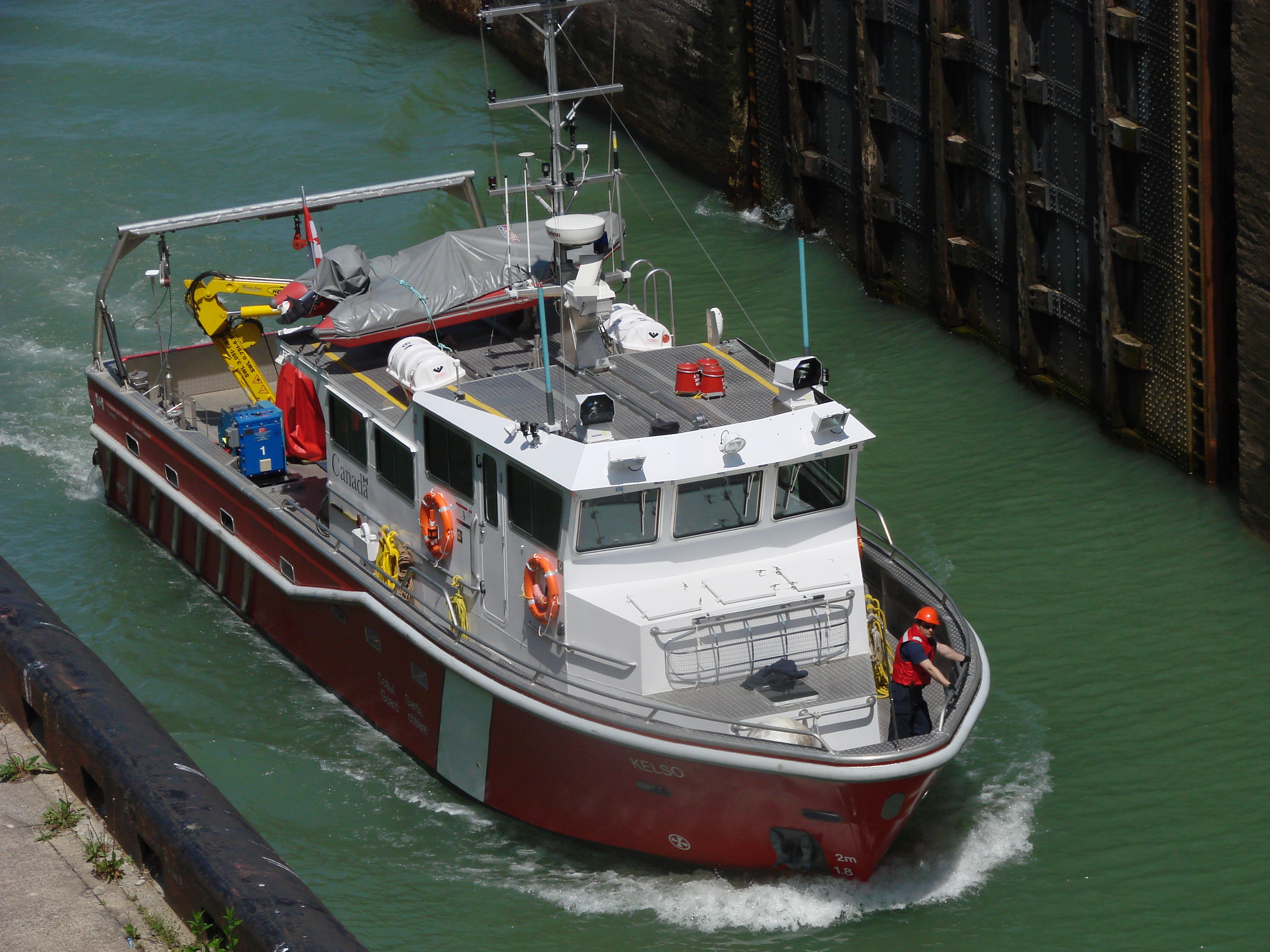
CCGS Kelso

== Ships in progress ==
In February 2011, ABCO Industries Ltd won the bid to build two 56 feet (17 m)-long aluminum vessels, operating at a service speed of 18 knots, for Halifax and Saint John. The contract was signed between ABCO Industries and the Atlantic Pilotage Authority, with vessels built according to the designs of naval architect Rory MacDonald of Lengkeek Vessel Engineering.

ABCO is building 12 metres (39 ft) landing craft for Harry DeWolf-class offshore patrol vessels. The six naval ships will have one each.

== Other recent projects ==
To date, the shipyard has made four vessels for Fisheries and Oceans Canada (DFO), including the scientific research vessel CCGS Kelso. As part of the Government of Canada's commitment to upgrading the Canadian Coast Guard fleet, the shipyard is contracted to build another a 46 feet (14 m)-long inshore patrol vessel to be based at Prince Edward Island. CCGS S. Dudka was commissioned in 2013.
