= MV Chilembwe =

History
- Name: Cilembwe
- Owner: Malawi Shipping Company
- Port of registry: (Malawi) Monkey Bay
- Route: Monkey Bay - Chilumba
- Builder: Mota Engil
- Cost: $8.5 million
- Launched: 2013
- Completed: 2015
- Status: in service

General characteristics
- Length: 33 m (108 ft 3 in)
- Beam: 9 m (29 ft 6 in)
- Installed power: diesel
- Propulsion: screw
- Capacity: 120 passengers, 20 tons cargo

MV Chilembwe is a passenger ship operating on Lake Malawi, named after Malawian freedom fighter John Chilembwe. It was launched in 2014 to partly replace the over 60-years old MV Ilala.

== History ==
In 2025 eleven people were killed as they tried to board the ship from a private vessel in the early hours of the morning.
