= Thalassa Hellas-class container ship =

Series of container ships

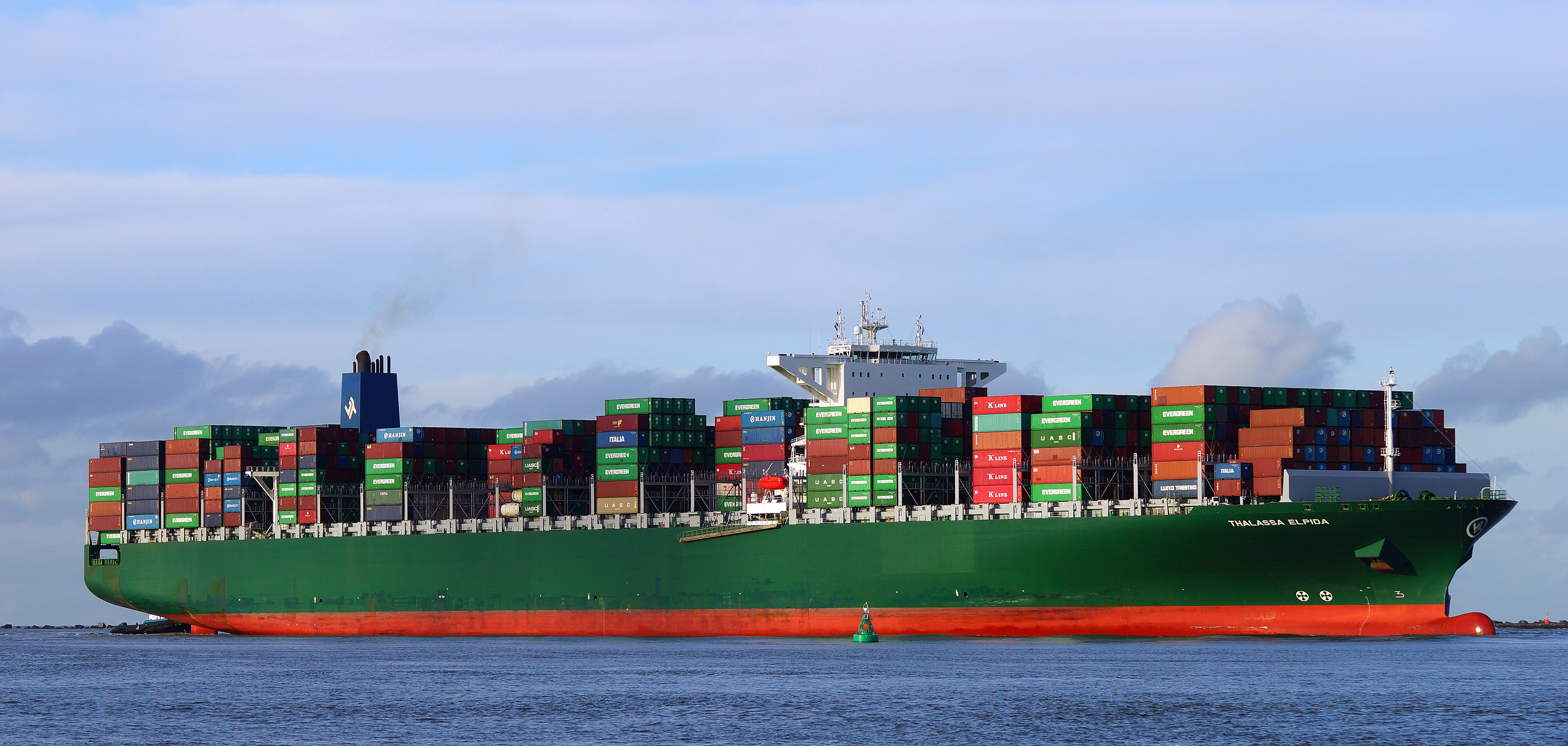
- Thalassa Elpida entering the Port of Rotterdam

Class overview
- Builders: Hyundai Heavy Industries
- Operators: Evergreen Marine, Hapag Lloyd
- In service: 2013–present
- Planned: 10
- Building: 0
- Completed: 10
- Active: 10

General characteristics
- Type: Container ship
- Tonnage: 148,667 GT
- Length: 368.5 m (1,209 ft)
- Beam: 51.1 m (168 ft)
- Draught: 15.8 m (52 ft)
- Propulsion: MAN Diesel & Turbo 11S90ME-C9.2-TII
- Capacity: 13,808 TEU

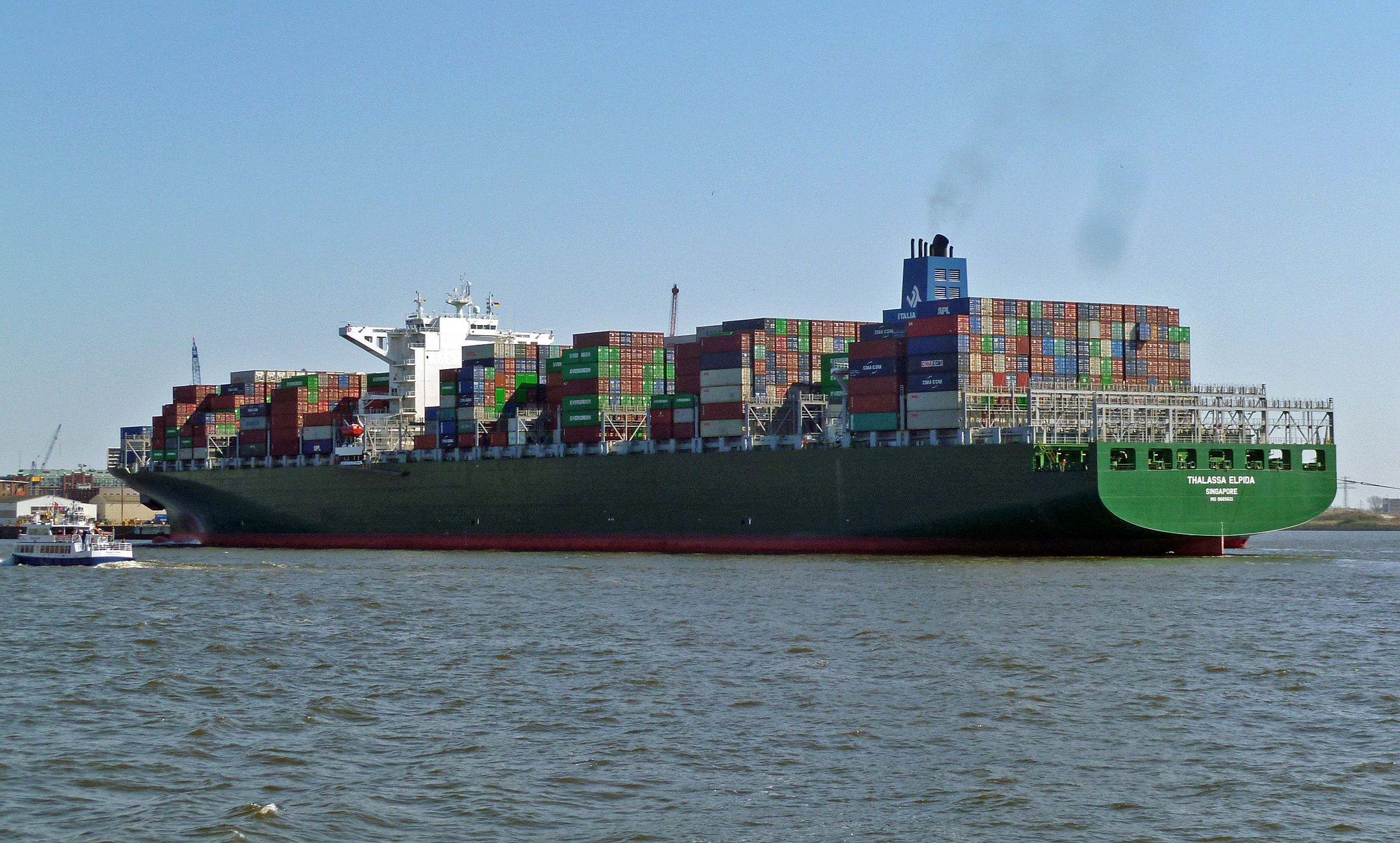
Stern view of Thalassa Elpida (2019)

The Thalassa Hellas class is a series of 10 container ships built for Enesel and operated by Evergreen Marine. The ships have a maximum theoretical capacity of 13,808 TEU. The ships were built by Hyundai Heavy Industries in South Korea.

== List of ships ==
Ship name	Previous name	Yard number	IMO number	Delivered	Status	Ref.
Norfolk Express	Thalassa Hellas (2013–2023)	2614	9665592	16 September 2013	In service	
Savannah Express	Thalassa Patris (2013–2023)	2615	9665607	28 November 2013	In service	
Ever Top	Thalassa Pistis (2014–2022)	2616	9665619	15 January 2014	In service	
Baltimore Express	Thalassa Elpida (2014–2023)	2617	9665621	20 March 2014	In service	
Los Angeles Express	Thalassa Avra (2014–2023)	2618	9665633	30 April 2014	In service	
Charleston Express	Thalassa Niki (2014–2023)	2619	9665645	18 June 2014	In service	
Houston Express	Thalassa Mana (2014–2023)	2623	9667150	17 July 2014	In service	
Atlanta Express	Thalassa Tyhi (2014–2023)	2624	9667162	31 July 2014	In service	
Oakland Express	Thalassa Doxa (2014–2023)	2625	9667174	20 August 2014	In service	
Vancouver Express	Thalassa Axia (2014–2023)	2626	9667186	24 November 2014	In service	

== See also ==
- Evergreen G-class container ship
- Triton-class container ship
