= OOCL M-class container ship =

140,000 ton class ships since 2013

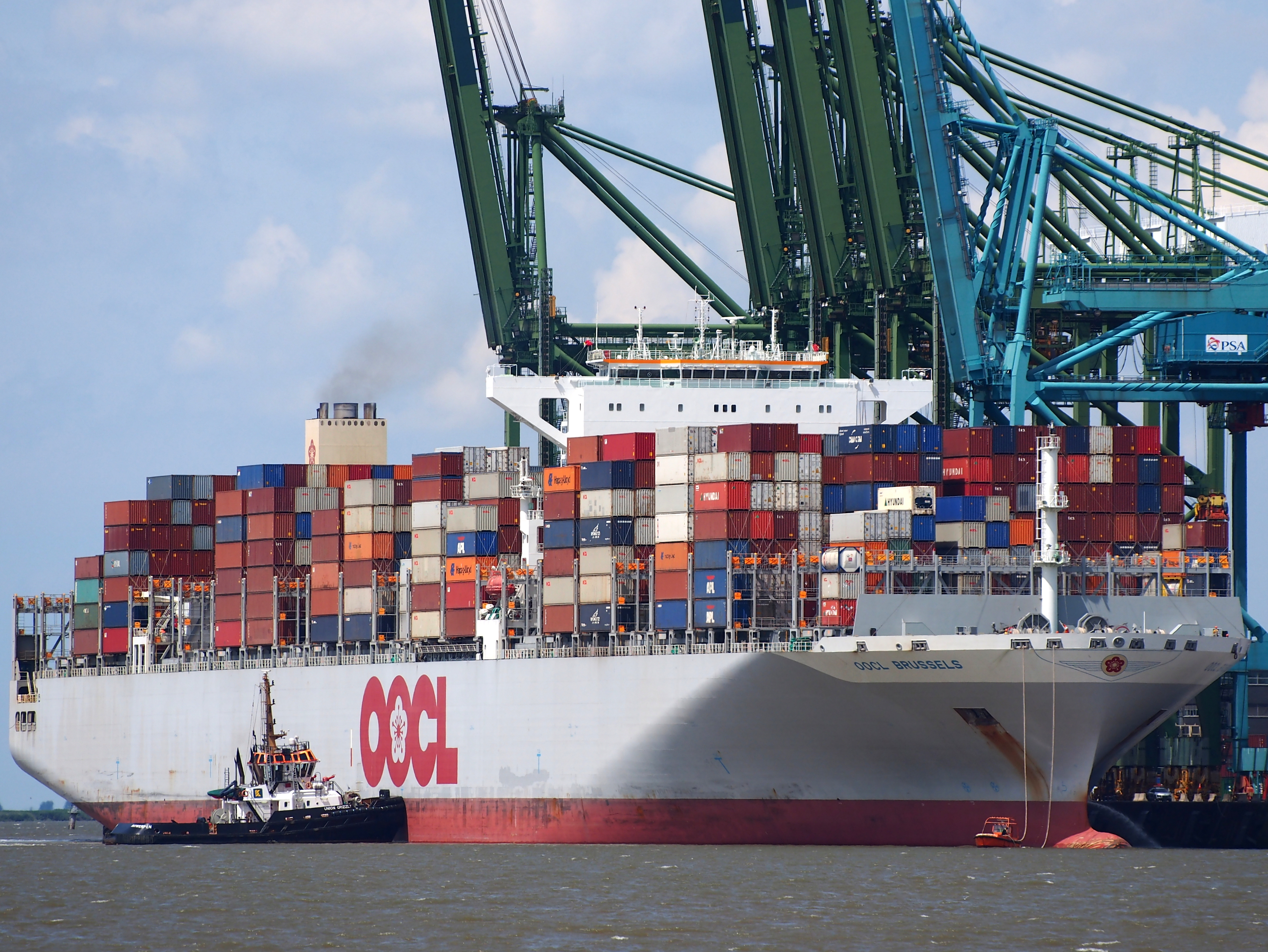
- OOCL Brussels in the port of Antwerp

Class overview
- Builders: Samsung Heavy Industries
- Operators: OOCL
- In service: 2013-present
- Completed: 10
- Active: 10

General characteristics
- Type: Container ship
- Tonnage: 141,003 GT
- Length: 366.469 m (1,202 ft)
- Beam: 48.2 m (158 ft)
- Draft: 14 m (46 ft)
- Capacity: 13,208 TEU

The M class is a series of 10 container ships built for OOCL with a maximum theoretical capacity of 13,208 TEU. The ships were built by Samsung Heavy Industries in South Korea. Construction started in 2012 and the first ship was delivered in 2013.

The original order was for just 6 ships and was signed in April 2011. Two months later it was announced that four additional ships would be ordered. They would be chartered to NYK Line for a length of three years. After the charter ended the ships were renamed and they have since become a part of the OOCL fleet.

== List of ships ==
Ship	Previous names	Yard number	IMO number	Delivery	Status	ref
OOCL Poland	NYK Helios (2013-2016)	2002	9622588	22 Jan 2013	In service	
OOCL Brussels		2003	9622590	26 Mar 2013	In service	
OOCL Berlin		2004	9622605	26 Mar 2013	In service	
OOCL France	NYK Hercules (2013-2016)	2005	9622617	30 Apr 2013	In service	
OOCL Chongqing		2006	9622629	28 Jun 2013	In service	
OOCL Egypt	NYK Hermes (2013-2016)	2007	9622631	26 Jul 2013	In service	
OOCL Bangkok		2008	9627978	13 Sep 2013	In service	
OOCL Malaysia	NYK Hyperion (2013-2016)	2009	9627980	16 Oct 2013	In service	
OOCL Korea		2010	9627992	17 Apr 2014	In service	
OOCL Singapore		2011	9628001	23 May 2014	In service	

== See also ==
- G-class container ship
