= HD Hyundai Samho =

South Korean shipbuilder

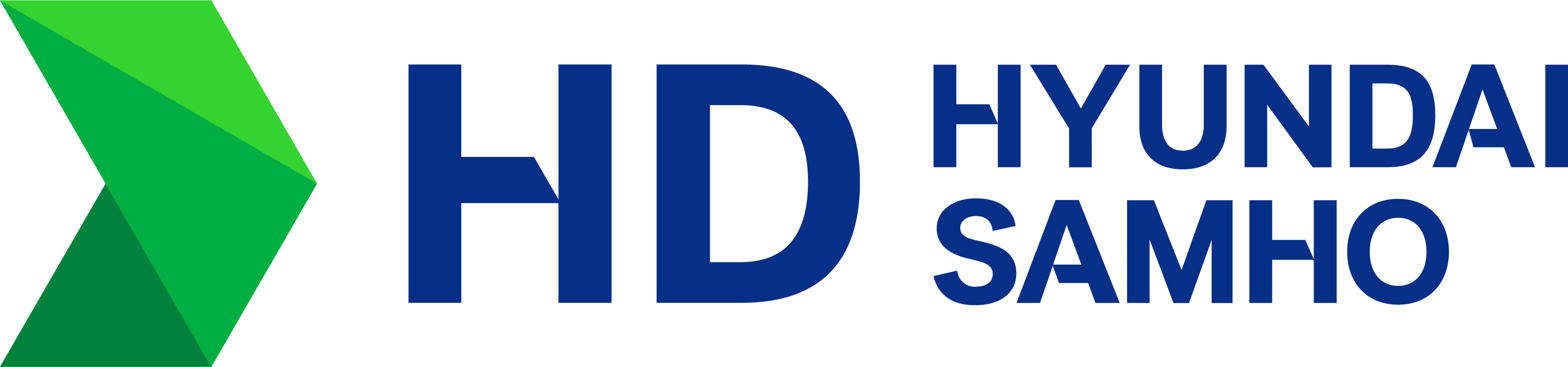
- Formerly: Halla Heavy Industries
- Founded: 1998; 28 years ago
- Headquarters: Yeongam, South Jeolla, South Korea
- Parent: HD Hyundai
- Website: www.hshi.co.kr/eng/

- HD Hyundai Samho
- Hangul: HD현대삼호
- RR: HD Hyeondae Samho
- MR: HD Hyŏndae Samho

HD Hyundai Samho (abbreviated: HSHI; Korean: HD현대삼호) is the world's largest dockyard and produces approximately 40 vessels per year. Its yard is located in Samho-eup, Yeongam, South Korea.

== History ==
The company was first established with a name of Incheon Shipbuilding (인천조선) in 1977 as a subsidiary company of Halla Group. (The founder of 'Halla group' was Chung In-Young the younger brother of Chung Ju-Yung, the founder of Hyundai Group) The first ship building dock was constructed in Incheon, South Korea. In 1990, the company changed its name to 'Halla Heavy Industries' (한라중공업) and moved the dockyard from Incheon to Samhoup which is located in Yeongam, South Jeolla Province. (total 3,300,000 square metres of land)

In 1997, during the Asian Financial Crisis, the mother company Halla group (was ranked 12th in terms of equity at that time) has fallen into bankruptcy, bringing its affiliates into the slump as well. In this chaos, Halla Heavy Industries had filed for bankruptcy protection. The Korean Government decided to consign the company's management to Hyundai Heavy Industries for 5 years. The condition was selling the company to Hyundai Heavy Industries when the company restore its financial state.

In 1998, RH Heavy Industries (Rothschild Halla Heavy Industries), a temporary company that inherited only the assets and debt from Halla Heavy Industries, has been established. In 1999, RH Heavy Industries changed its name to 'Samho Heavy Industries' and in 2003, it finally changed the name to 'Hyundai Samho Heavy Industries' after the acquisition by Hyundai Heavy Industries in 2002. Today, Hyundai Heavy Industries owns 94.92% of the company's stock.

The company's formal establish year was 1998, because the company was formally re-established as RH Heavy Industries in 1998 when Rothschild temporarily bought the company.

== Achievements ==
After the purchase by Hyundai Heavy Industries, Hyundai Samho Heavy Industries has experienced rapid growth both internally and externally. In 2004, only 2 years after the take over by Hyundai Heavy Industries, the company has recorded $1 billion of overseas sales. In 2006, the company built a hull of a FPSO (Floating Production Storage Offloading) vessel and started to build LNG Carriers, LPG carriers and PCTCs (Pure Car & Truck Carrier). Furthermore, the company increased the capability of ship building up to 50 ships per year by constructing a mega size floating dry dock. 3 years later in 2009, Hyundai Samho Heavy Industries recorded an outstanding $3 billion of overseas sales. At the same year, the company has built a 30 million CGT ship in the shortest time period among the entire shipbuilding industry.

Hyundai Samho Heavy Industries now has 2 mega docks and an additional floating dock which can produce approximately 50 ships annually (4.3 Million GT), 5 Goliath Cranes including cranes of maximum lifting limit of 1200 tonnes and 900 tonnes. According to Clarkson Research, Hyundai Samho Heavy Industries is apparently one of the largest shipbuilding company in the world. The company not only possess world class painting shops but also have obtained ISO 9001 and ISO 14001 certificates.

== Products ==
Hyundai Samho Heavy Industries has two major divisions - Ship Building and Industrial Equipment. The Ship Building division mainly produces Tankers, Bulk carriers, Container ships, Gas and Chemical carriers (mostly LNG carriers). The Industrial Equipment division manufactures industrial transportation equipment such as Goliath cranes and container offloading cranes. The company is also participating in the Panama Canal Locks rebuilding project since 2010.

=== Ship building ===
Hyundai Samho Heavy Industries has total of 3 docks. The 1st Dock (504 × 100 × 13m) can produce up to 800,000DWTs, 2nd Dock (594 × 104 × 13m) 1,000,000DWTs and No.1 Berth Dock (335 × 70 × 24m) which is the Floating Dock 500,000DWTs. The length of the Docks total up to 2.1 km while average depth is 12m. 5 Goliath cranes are in operation. Two 600 tonne cranes are at the first dock, two 900 tonne cranes at 2nd Dock, one 1,200 tonne mega-crane at the No.1 Berth Dock.

Fully operating the three docks can build up to 50 ships annually. (one ship in eight days) To build one ship takes approximately 20 to 24 months, including contract, ship design, keel laying, launching, delivery, after service and so on. Most of the materials are Hi-Ten steel plate and mild steel plate. The 3 largest suppliers are Posco, Dongkuk Steel and Hyundai Steel.

Since 1999, the company has built 46 bulk carriers (6,087,244 DWT), 134 tankers (23,722,329 DWT), 83 containerships (6,356,184 DWT), 4 LPG carriers (224,272 DWT), 3 LNG carriers (254,800 DWT), 10 PCTC carriers (238,754 DWT) and one FPSO (321,300 DWT).

=== Industrial equipment ===
The Industrial Equipment Division was originally a subdivision of Hyundai Heavy Industry (HHI). Hyundai Samho Heavy Industry (HSHI) has taken over the division on 1 February 2004. Industrial Equipment division has produced over 1,200 cranes so far (since 1973). Its main products are bulk transporting facility, wharf & yard cranes for ports, goliath cranes & overhead cranes for steel plants or power plants.

== See also ==
- Shipbuilding companies
- Shipbuilding countries
- Economy of South Korea
- Goliath crane (disambiguation)
