= Heian Maru =

Heian Maru can refer to:

- A number of steamships including:
  - SS Komagata Maru, a Japanese cargo ship in service 1924-26
  - SS Heian Maru (1902), a Japanese cargo ship in service 1930-33
  - SS Heian Maru (1917), a Japanese cargo ship in service 1917-45 or later
  - SS Heian Maru (1920), a Japanese cargo ship in service 1920-44
  - Heian Maru, a Japanese ocean liner launched in 1930 and sunk in 1944 while serving as a submarine tender
- MV Heian Maru, a number of ships with this name
