= Yasukuni Maru =

Japanese cargo ship (1930–1944)

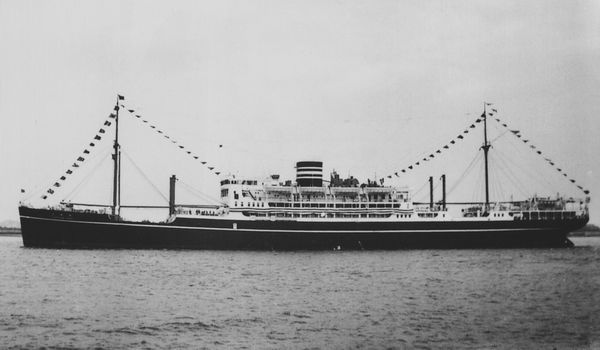
- NYK's Yasukuni Maru arriving at London in 1930.

History

Japan
- Name: Yasukuni Maru
- Operator: Nippon Yusen (NYK)
- Builder: Mitsubishi Shipbuilding Nagasaki, Japan
- Yard number: 468
- Laid down: 22 April 1929
- Launched: 15 February 1930
- Completed: 31 August 1930
- In service: 1930
- Out of service: 31 January 1944
- Stricken: 10 March 1944
- Identification: Call sign JRZB; Official Number 36223
- Fate: Torpedoed and sunk, 31 January 1944
- Stricken: 10 March 1944

General characteristics
- Class & type: Terukuni Maru-class ocean liner
- Tonnage: 11,933 GRT
- Length: 153.92 m (505 ft 0 in) pp
- Beam: 19.51 m (64 ft 0 in)
- Draught: 11.28 m (37 ft 0 in)
- Propulsion: 2 Mitsubishi-Sulzer diesel engines, 14,368 hp (10,714 kW)
- Speed: 18 knots (33 km/h; 21 mph)
- Capacity: 249 (121 first class, 68 second class, 60 third class)
- Crew: 177
- Notes: Steel construction

Yasukuni Maru (靖国丸) was a Japanese ocean liner owned by Nippon Yusen Kaisha (NYK). The ship was launched in 1930 by Mitsubishi Shipbuilding & Engineering Co. at Nagasaki, on the southern island of Kyūshū, Japan, entering service in 1930. The ship was named for the Yasukuni Shrine, a famous Shinto shrine dedicated to the war dead of Japan, located in Tokyo. At the outbreak of the Second World War, it was the last ship to sail for Japan from Europe during the conflict. On 31 January 1944 Yasukuni Maru was attacked by the US submarine USS Trigger and hit by two torpedoes. She took on water rapidly and sank within five minutes.

== Background ==
Yasukuni Maru and her sister ship Terukuni Maru were built for NYK's fortnightly scheduled high-speed European service, coming into operation in late 1930. Both ships were specially designed for tropical conditions, with state-of-the-art air conditioning and fresh air circulation systems, as their routing was south from Japan, through the Indian Ocean, Suez Canal and Mediterranean Sea. Both ships were initially designed for use with geared turbine engines for projected cruising speed of 18 knots (33 km/h; 21 mph). However, under increasing pressure from the Japanese government to use only equipment and technologies available domestically, the design was changed to use standard Mitsubishi-Sulzer marine diesel engines, which reduced cruising speed to 15 knots (28 km/h; 17 mph).

The 11,933-ton steel-hulled vessel had a length of 526.5 feet (160.5 m), and a beam of 64 feet (20 m), with a single funnel, two masts, and double screws. Yasukuni Maru provided accommodation for 121 first-class passengers and 68 second class passengers. There was also room for up to 60 third-class passengers. The ship and passengers were served by a crew of 177.

== Civilian career ==
Yasukuni Maru departed Yokohama on her maiden voyage on 22 September 1930 for London, with ports of call in between at Yokkaichi, Osaka, Kobe, Moji-ku, Shanghai, Hong Kong, Singapore, Penang, Colombo, Aden, Suez, Port Said, Marseille, and Gibraltar. On her return to Yokohama, she substituted Naples for Marseille and arrived back at Yokohama on 18 October 1930. Thereafter, she entered regular service with NYK, following the same routing.

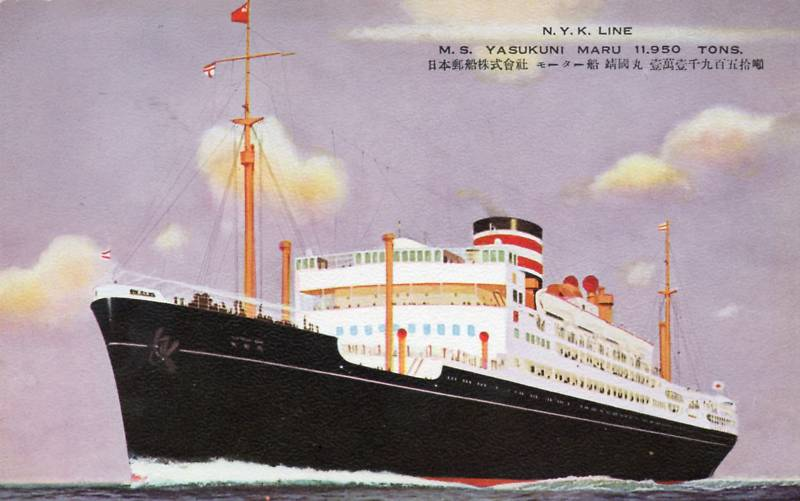
Yasukuni Maru, NYK postcard, 1930s.

On 23 June 1933, Yasukuni Maru rescued five crewmen from a sinking Chinese junk near Hong Kong. On 5 April 1934, Yasukuni Maru responded to a distress call from the Imperial Japanese Navy training cruiser Asama at Port Said, Egypt, and took off several ill sailors including an appendicitis patient. On 12 March 1935, when Yasukuni Maru docked at London, it was reported that a 75-pound (34 kg) silver ingot had been stolen from her treasury. Yasukuni Maru carried the Japanese Olympic team back from Germany after the 1936 Berlin Olympics. On 16 November 1937, Yasukuni Maru became the first ship on the Europe-Japan route to be equipped with a two-way ship-to-shore wireless telephone for passengers to make telephone calls.

On 2 October 1938, Yasukuni Maru transported an art mission consisting of 30 Takarasiennes from the Takarazuka Revue, together with 18 managers, orchestra members and support staff from Kobe to Naples for an art mission to Germany and Italy commemorating the first anniversary of the signing of the Anti-Comintern Pact. In September – October 1939, at the request of the Foreign Ministry, Yasukuni Maru evacuated 240 Japanese civilians, members of the diplomatic staff and some German nationals from Germany on the verge of World War II. She returned to Yokohama on 18 October and was requisitioned by the Imperial Japanese Navy (IJN) on 25 October to 11 December for use as an auxiliary transport and was briefly used to transport troops and war materials from Japan to China during the Second Sino-Japanese War. However, as the war situation stabilized, she was returned to NYK.

With the situation in Europe regarded as unsafe following the sinking of Terukuni Maru off the coast of Great Britain by a naval mine, Yasukuni Maru was rescheduled for use on NYK's route from Kobe to South America via Honolulu, Hilo, San Francisco and Los Angeles. On 8 August 1940 Yasukuni Maru embarked 30 German pilots previously employed in Colombia for return to Germany.

== Military career ==
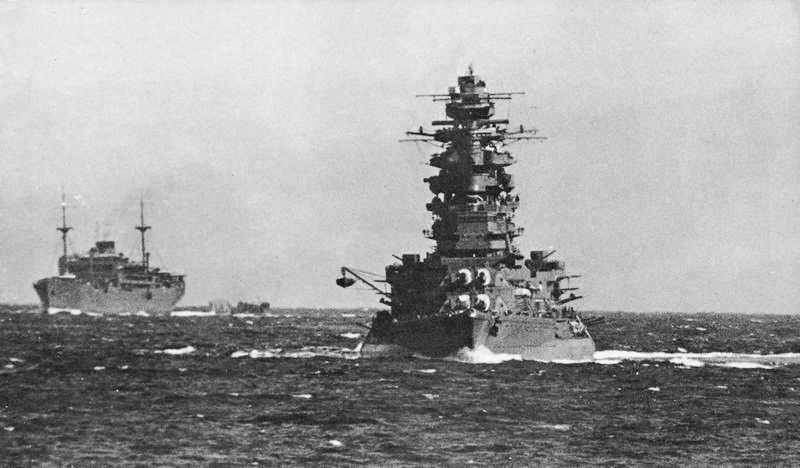
Yasukuni Maru in the background and the battleship Nagato at sea, 1941.

On 29 October 1940, Yasukuni Maru was again requisitioned by the IJN, and was classified this time as an auxiliary submarine tender. She was taken to Kure Naval Arsenal, where her luxurious internal fittings were torn out, and she was repainted gunmetal grey. On 11 January 1941 she was assigned to the 1st Submarine Division of the IJN 6th Fleet. During the conversion, she was armed with six obsolete 152 mm/50 cal. (6-inch) guns in single mounts and two dual mount Type 93 13.2 mm machine guns and fitted with one 1,110 mm and one 900 mm searchlight. During most of the remainder of 1941, Yasukuni Maru was based at Takao in Taiwan for patrols of Ryukyu Islands and the coast of China. However, at the time of the attack on Pearl Harbor, she was based at Kwajalein. On 20 December 1941, she was assigned to the 3rd Submarine Division, still with the IJN 6th Fleet.

Kwajalein was attacked on 1 February 1942 by aircraft from United States Navy Task Force 8 led by the aircraft carrier USS Enterprise, with Yasukuni Maru hit by one bomb in her aft turret and damage to her stern. She returned to Kure on 1 March for repairs lasting to 23 April. She returned to Kure again on 23 November for repairs and regular maintenance.

In early 1943, Yasukuni Maru was assigned to "Operation C", the reinforcement of the Japanese landing on New Guinea. Yasukuni Maru, with 1,448 men and 11 tanks of the Imperial Japanese Army (IJA)'s 20th Infantry Division departed Pusan for Wewak on 8 January 1943 together with the transports Hakozaki Maru and Aratama Maru and the destroyer Hatsuyuki. The convoy successfully delivered the reinforcements to Rabaul and Wewak. On 4 February 1943, Yasukuni Maru took on troops and supplies of the IJA 41st Infantry Division at Qingdao, China, disembarking the troops at Wewak at the end of the month, and returning to Kure in early March. She was based at Truk in April and was part of another troop convoy to Balikpapan in May. In October, she was part of the convoyed evacuating surviving Japanese troops from Wewak to Palau and returned to Japan at the end of December 1943.

On 24 January 1944, Yasukuni Maru was assigned to a troop convoy departing Tateyama, Chiba for Truk. On 31 January, approximately 17 miles (27 km) northwest of Truk, the convoy was attacked by the US submarine USS Trigger and Yasukuni Maru was hit by two torpedoes. She took on water rapidly and sank within five minutes at 09°15′N 147°13′E with loss of 300 crewmen and 888 technicians. Escorting destroyer Shiratsuyu recovered only 43 survivors. She was struck from the navy list on 10 March 1944.

== See also ==
- List of ocean liners
