= Terukuni Maru (1929) =

Japanese cargo ship

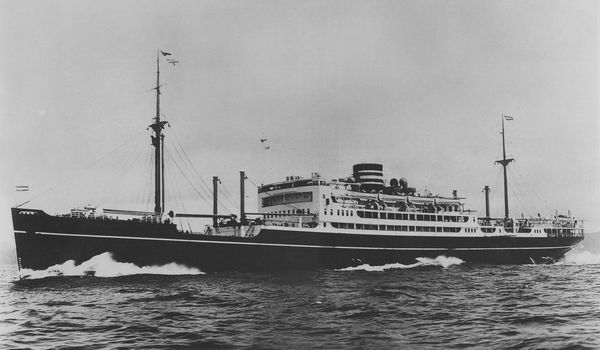
- NYK Terukuni Maru, 1930s

History

Japan
- Name: Terukuni Maru
- Operator: Nippon Yusen (NYK)
- Builder: Mitsubishi Shipbuilding & Engineering Co. Nagasaki
- Yard number: 467
- Laid down: 9 January 1929
- Launched: 19 December 1929
- Completed: 31 May 1930
- In service: 1930
- Fate: Mined off UK coast 21 November 1939

General characteristics
- Class & type: Terukuni Maru class ocean liner
- Tonnage: 11,931 gross register tons (GRT)
- Length: 153.92 m (505.0 ft)pp
- Beam: 19.51 m (64.0 ft)
- Draught: 11.28 m (37.0 ft)
- Propulsion: 2 Mitsubishi-Sulzer diesel engines, 10,000 hp (7,500 kW)
- Speed: 17 knots
- Capacity: 249
- Crew: 177
- Notes: Steel construction

Terukuni Maru (照国丸) was a Japanese ocean liner owned by Nippon Yusen Kaisha (NYK). The ship was launched in 1929 by Mitsubishi Shipbuilding & Engineering Co. at Nagasaki, on the southern island of Kyūshū, Japan, entering service in 1930. She sank off the English coast in 1939 after striking a mine. Her sinking has been described as Japan's only World War II casualty outside East Asia before the 1941 attack on Pearl Harbor.

== History ==
The ship was named for the Terukuni jinja, a Shinto shrine located in Kagoshima. The Terukuni Maru and her sister ship Yasukuni Maru were built for NYK's fortnightly scheduled high-speed European service, coming into operation from the autumn of 1930. Both ships were specially designed for tropical conditions, with state-of-the-art air conditioning and fresh air circulation systems, as their routing was south from Japan, through the Indian Ocean, Suez Canal and Mediterranean Sea. Both ships were initially designed for use with geared turbine engines for projected cruising speed of 18 knots. However, under increasing pressure from the Japanese government to use only equipment and technologies available domestically, the design was changed to use standard Mitsubishi-Sulzer marine diesel engines, which reduced cruising speed to 15 knots.

The 11,931-ton steel-hulled vessel had a length of 505 feet (154 m), and a beam of 64 feet (20 m), with a single funnel, two masts, and double screws. Terukuni Maru provided accommodation for 121 first-class passengers and 68 second class passengers. There was also room for up to 60 third-class passengers. The ship and passengers were served by a crew of 177.

== Final voyage ==
On 24 September 1939, at 5 PM, Terukuni Maru departed Yokohama on her 25th voyage to Europe. En route, she made her usual scheduled ports of call: Nagoya, Osaka, Kobe, Moji, Shanghai, Hong Kong, Singapore, Penang, and Colombo. After transiting the Suez Canal, she called at Beirut, Naples and Marseille (where she stayed for four days), followed by Casablanca. At 9 AM on 19 November, she transited the Dover Straits, turning north to the mouth of the River Thames and her final destination of London. She took aboard a pilot off the South Downs, and underwent contraband inspection while Royal Navy minesweepers checked her route into London for mines. After receiving clearance to proceed, at 35 minutes after midnight on the morning of 21 November, an explosion occurred between her second and third holds, after she struck a German magnetic mine at 51°50′N 01°30′E off Harwich on the Essex coast. She sank in less than 45 minutes, but there were no fatalities as all 28 passengers and 177 crew members were able to escape in lifeboats.

As Japan was officially neutral at the time, the sinking of the Terukuni Maru led to a diplomatic incident between Japan and both the United Kingdom and Germany. Both countries officially denied responsibility for the mine. However, it is almost certain to have been a German mine because the type of mine used is one that had been developed by the Germans and because the United Kingdom would not have placed mines in its own shipping lanes. Although Japan was increasingly allied towards Germany, the Japanese government protested the loss with the Nazi German government, but the ship owner was not compensated for the loss.

The wrecked ship lay partly submerged on its side at 8 fathoms (48 ft; 15 m) depth, visible to wartime shipping. The wreckage was examined for salvage potential, but salvage work was not undertaken. In 1946 the ship was demolished with explosives as part of a British effort to remove war debris from coastal waters. The remains of the Terukuni Maru have been recorded.

A model of the ship is displayed in the library of the University of Strathclyde in Glasgow.

== See also ==
- List of ocean liners
