= Hikawa Maru =

Japanese ocean liner

Coordinates: 35°26′48″N 139°39′05″E

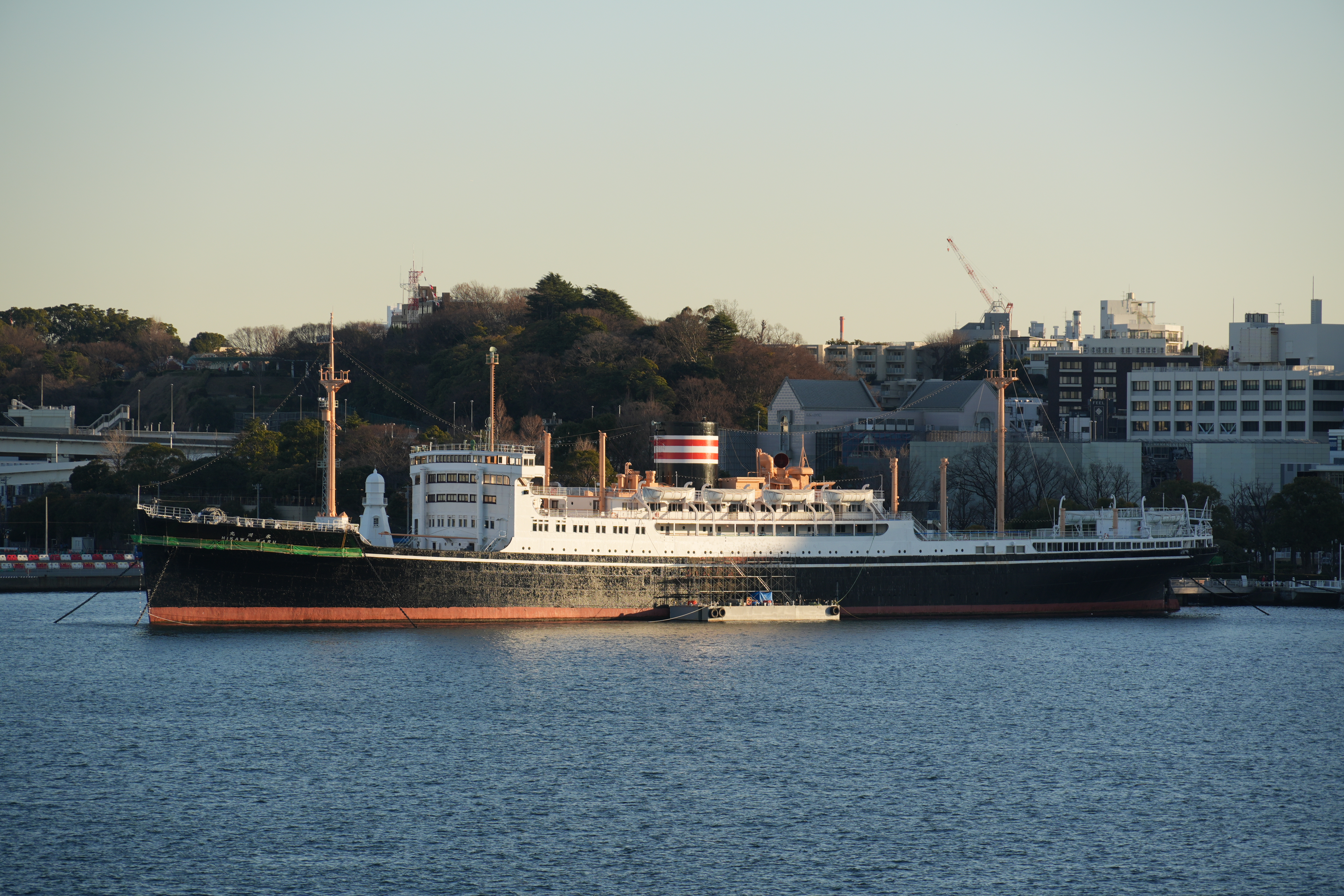
- Hikawa Maru at Yamashita Park, Naka-ku, Yokohama

History

Japan
- Name: Hikawa Maru
- Namesake: Hikawa Shrine, Saitama
- Owner: Nippon Yūsen Kabushiki Kaisha; (NYK Line)
- Operator: NYK Line (1930–41; 1947–60); (Empire of Japan) Imperial Japanese Navy (1941–45); (Japan) SCAJAP (1945–47)
- Port of registry: Yokohama
- Route: Yokohama – Vancouver – Seattle
- Builder: Yokohama Dock Co.
- Laid down: 9 November 1928
- Launched: 30 September 1929
- Maiden voyage: 13 May 1930
- Out of service: 21 December 1960
- Identification: H-022 (with SCAJAP, 1945–47)
- Status: Museum ship since 1961

General characteristics
- Class & type: Hikawa Maru class
- Type: Ocean liner (1929–41; 1953–60); Hospital ship (1941–45); repatriation transport (1945–46); Cargo ship (1947–53)
- Tonnage: 11,622 GRT
- Length: 163.3 m (535 ft 9 in)
- Beam: 20.1 m (65 ft 11 in)
- Propulsion: (1930–60) Burmeister & Wain marine diesel engines, twin screws; (1960–present)
- Speed: 18.38 knots (34.04 km/h; 21.15 mph)
- Capacity: 331 passengers: 75 first class; 70 tourist class; 186 third class
- Crew: 147 (Including an addition of 16)
- Notes: sister ships: Heian Maru; Hie Maru

Hikawa Maru (氷川丸) is a retired Japanese ocean liner that Yokohama Dock Company built for the NYK Line. She was launched on 30 September 1929 and made her maiden voyage from Kobe to Seattle on 13 May 1930. She is permanently berthed as a museum ship at Yamashita Park, Naka-ku, Yokohama.

Hikawa Maru was one of three Hikawa Maru-class motor ships, all named after major Shinto shrines. The Hikawa Shrine is in Saitama in central Honshu. Her two sister ships, both lost in the Second World War, were Heian Maru and Hie Maru.

== Service history ==
=== Civilian service ===
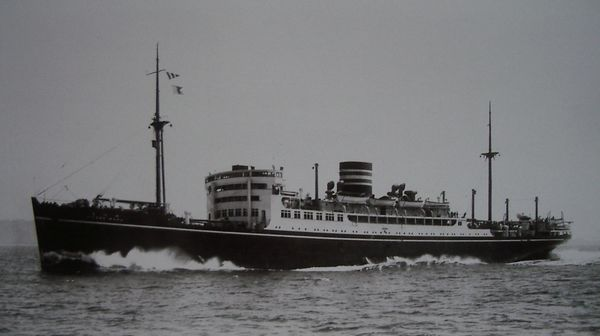
Hikawa Maru on her maiden voyage, 22 May 1930

Hikawa Maru and her sisters ran a regular liner route between Yokohama, Vancouver and Seattle. She had a reputation for service that combined splendid food and beautiful art deco interiors, and she was nicknamed "The Queen of the Pacific". Charlie Chaplin travelled on her for part of the round the World tour that he made in 1932. On 17 December 1931, Korean independence activist Lee Bong-chang took the ship from Shanghai to Kobe, on his way to attempt to assassinate Emperor Hirohito. Kanō Jigorō, the founder of Judo and Japan's representative on the International Olympic Committee, died whilst aboard in 1938.

In 1940–41, before Japan's entry to the Second World War, hundreds of Jewish refugees from Nazi persecution fled to Canada and the United States via Japan, and many of them sailed on Hikawa Maru. In August 1940 a party of 82 German and Lithuanian Jews who had travelled via the USSR and Vladivostok reached Seattle on Hikawa Maru. Later, Rabbi Zerach Warhaftig and his family travelled east from Lithuania to Japan. They left Yokohama on Hikawa Maru on 5 June 1941 and landed in Vancouver, British Columbia, Canada, on 17 June. He described the trip as "a summer vacation and with the war seeming to be so far away" although, he said "I didn't have a peaceful mind because of the strong responsibility I had to help the Jewish refugees with the troubles they faced."

In July 1941 the US and other countries retaliating against Japan's invasion of French Indochina ordered the seizure of Japanese assets. However, the United States gave assurances that the liners would not be seized so Heian Maru and Hikawa Maru continued their regular service to US ports. In October 1941 Hikawa Maru became the last NYK ship to visit a US port before Japan and the US went to war. She brought US refugees to Seattle, and on her return voyage she repatriated 400 Japanese nationals.

=== Hospital ship service ===
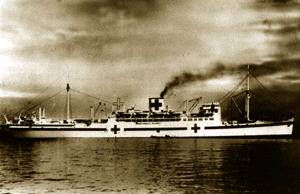
Hikawa Maru as a hospital ship, 1941–1945

On 1 December 1941, a week before Japan's attack on Pearl Harbor, the Mitsubishi Zosen dockyard at Yokohama started to convert Hikawa Maru into a hospital ship, completing work on her on 21 December. She treated Japanese casualties from the US Task Force 8's attacks on Kwajalein and Wotje atolls in February 1942 and repatriated the seriously wounded to Yokosuka. On 15 June 1942 the Japanese cruiser Nagara brought about 500 Japanese wounded from the Battle of Midway to Hashirajima, where they were transferred to Hikawa Maru.

Three times Hikawa Maru survived being damaged by mines. The first was on 3 October 1942 while entering port at Surabaya, Java. She was repaired in port and departed on 10 October. The second was on 15 July 1944 when a magnetic mine damaged her off the Caroline Islands. She stopped in Davao in the Philippines on 19–26 July where her damage was inspected and on 1 August she reached Yokosuka for repairs. The third was on 17 February 1945 when she was leaving the Port of Singapore. Her stern struck a mine in the Singapore Strait but she returned to port and was repaired. In March and April the Mitsubishi dockyard at Yokohama made further repairs on her, and from 21 June to 4 July she was drydocked at Maizuru.

=== Post-war service ===
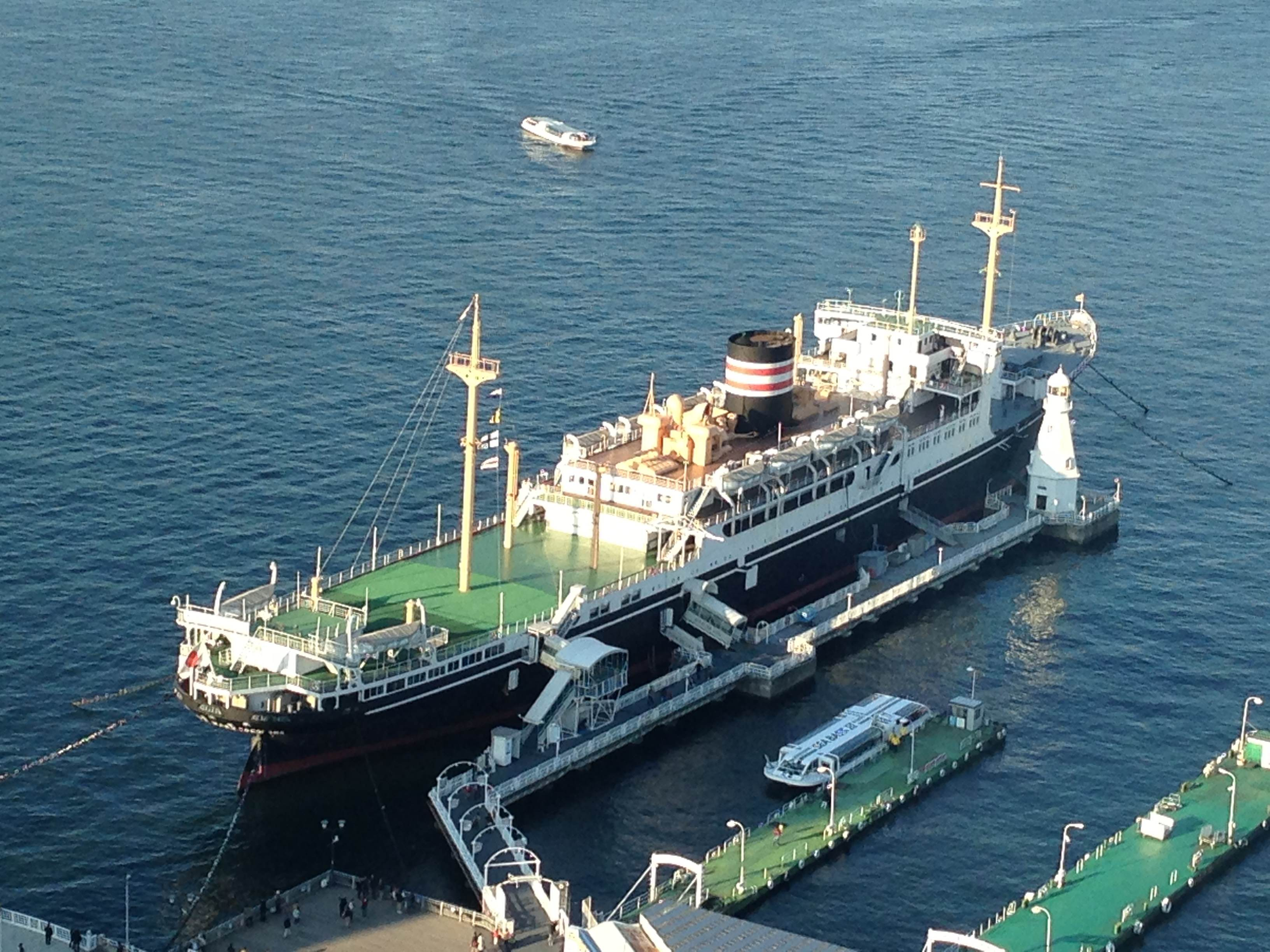
Hikawa Maru and her permanent berth at Yamashita Park, Naka-ku, Yokohama

When Japan surrendered on 15 August Hikawa Maru was one of only two Japanese large passenger ships to have survived the war. The other was another hospital ship, Osaka Shosen Kaisha's Takasago Maru. Hie Maru and Heian Maru had been converted into submarine depot ships and were attacked and sunk in 1943 and 1944.

The United States occupied Japan and in September 1945 the Shipping Control Authority for the Japanese Merchant Marine (SCAJAP) requisitioned Hikawa Maru as ship number H-022. She repatriated thousands of Japanese soldiers and civilians from the Pacific Islands, Korea, the Dutch East Indies and China until August 1946, when she docked in Yokohama for repairs.

In 1947 SCAJAP returned Hikawa Maru to NYK, which despite her passenger capacity ran her mostly as a cargo ship until 1953. Her work included general cargo between Japan and the East Coast of the United States, a liner service between Japan and Burma in 1949 and iron ore from Thailand. In the war NYK had lost 172 ships totalling 1.028 million Gross register tons, which may explain why the company used an ocean liner for any cargo.

In 1953 NYK had Hikawa Maru refitted as an ocean liner and returned her to her pre-war Yokohama – Seattle route. She remained on the route until NYK decommissioned her on 21 December 1960. Her peacetime service on the route 1930–1941 and 1953–1960 totalled 238 voyages and 25,000 passengers.

== Preservation ==
In 1961 Hikawa Maru was permanently berthed at Yamashita Park, Naka-ku, Yokohama, as a floating museum, hotel and restaurant. In 2005 her owners announced that they had suffered substantial financial losses and were seeking to sell Hikawa Maru. In December 2006 her museum was closed and doubts about her future were raised. However, NYK Line underwrote her restoration, which began in August 2007. She was renamed NYK Hikawamaru and was reopened to the public at Yamashita Park on 25 April 2008.

On 17 August 2016, Hikawa Maru was officially designated as an Important Cultural Property by the Ministry of Education, Culture, Sports, Science and Technology of Japan.

== Gallery ==
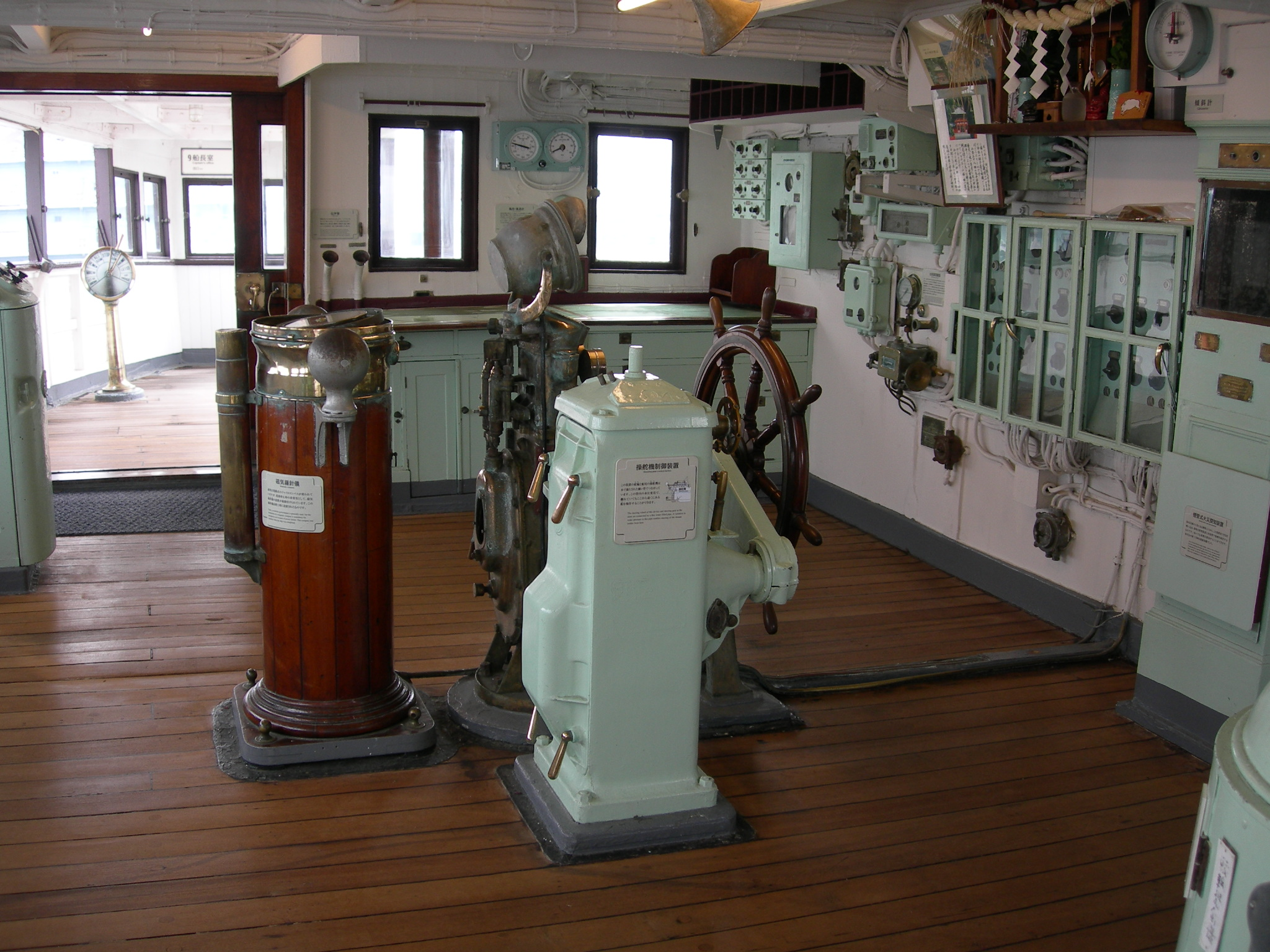
The wheelhouse on Hikawa Maru's bridge

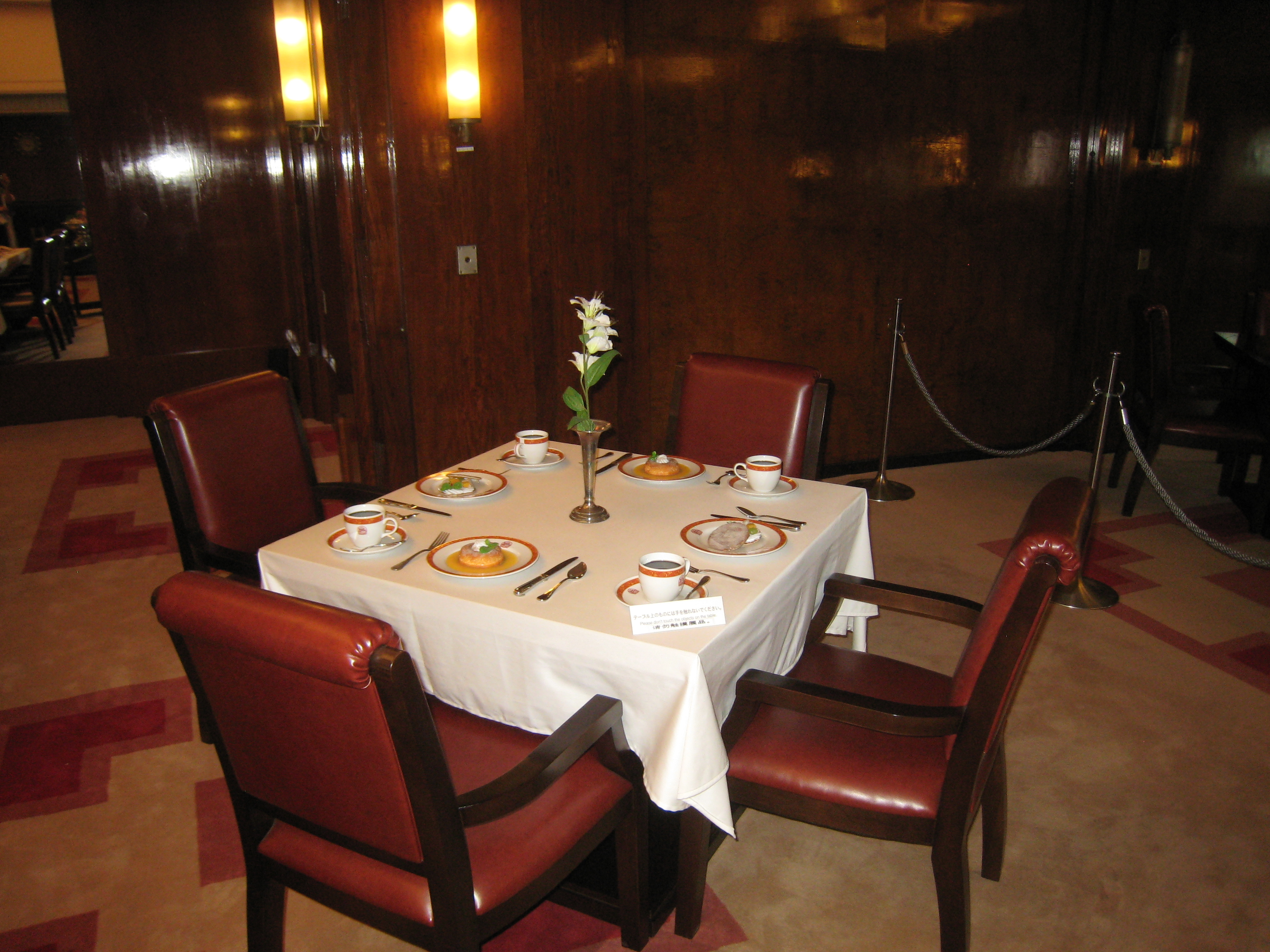
Restaurant on the Hikawa Maru

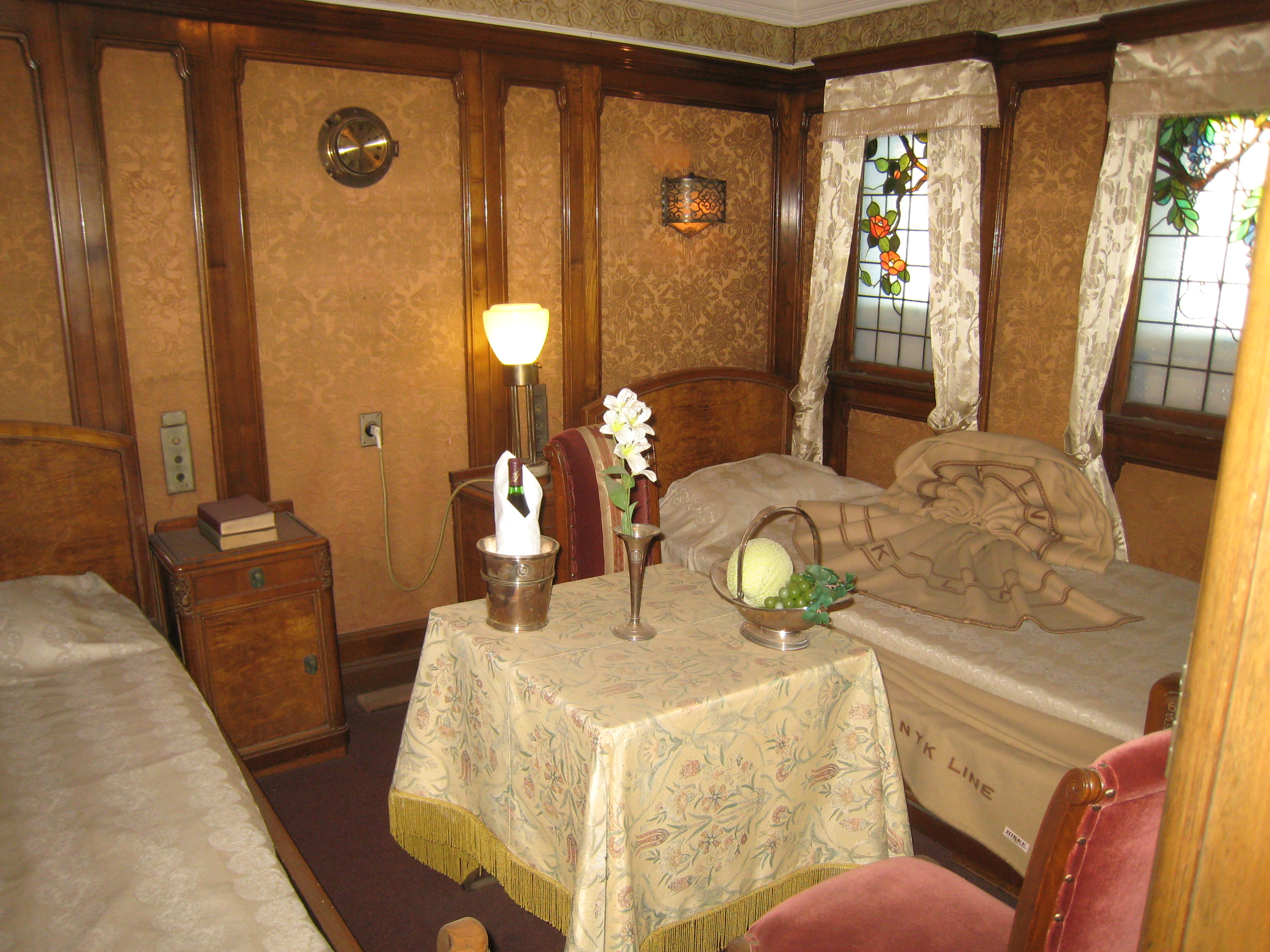
Bedroom of a cabin on the Hikawa Maru

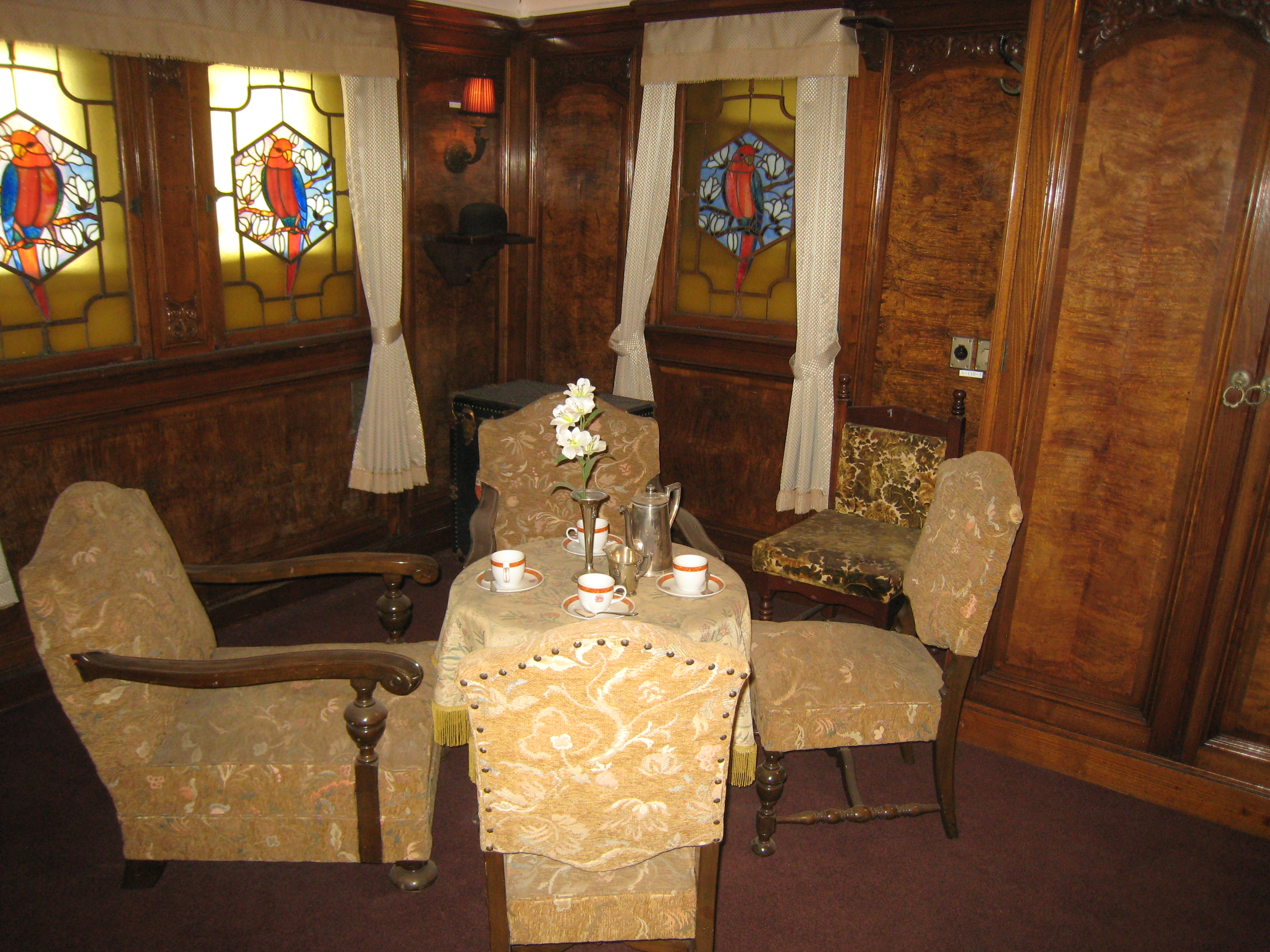
Lounge of a cabin on the Hikawa Maru

Several views of outside and inside Hikawa Maru, 2026

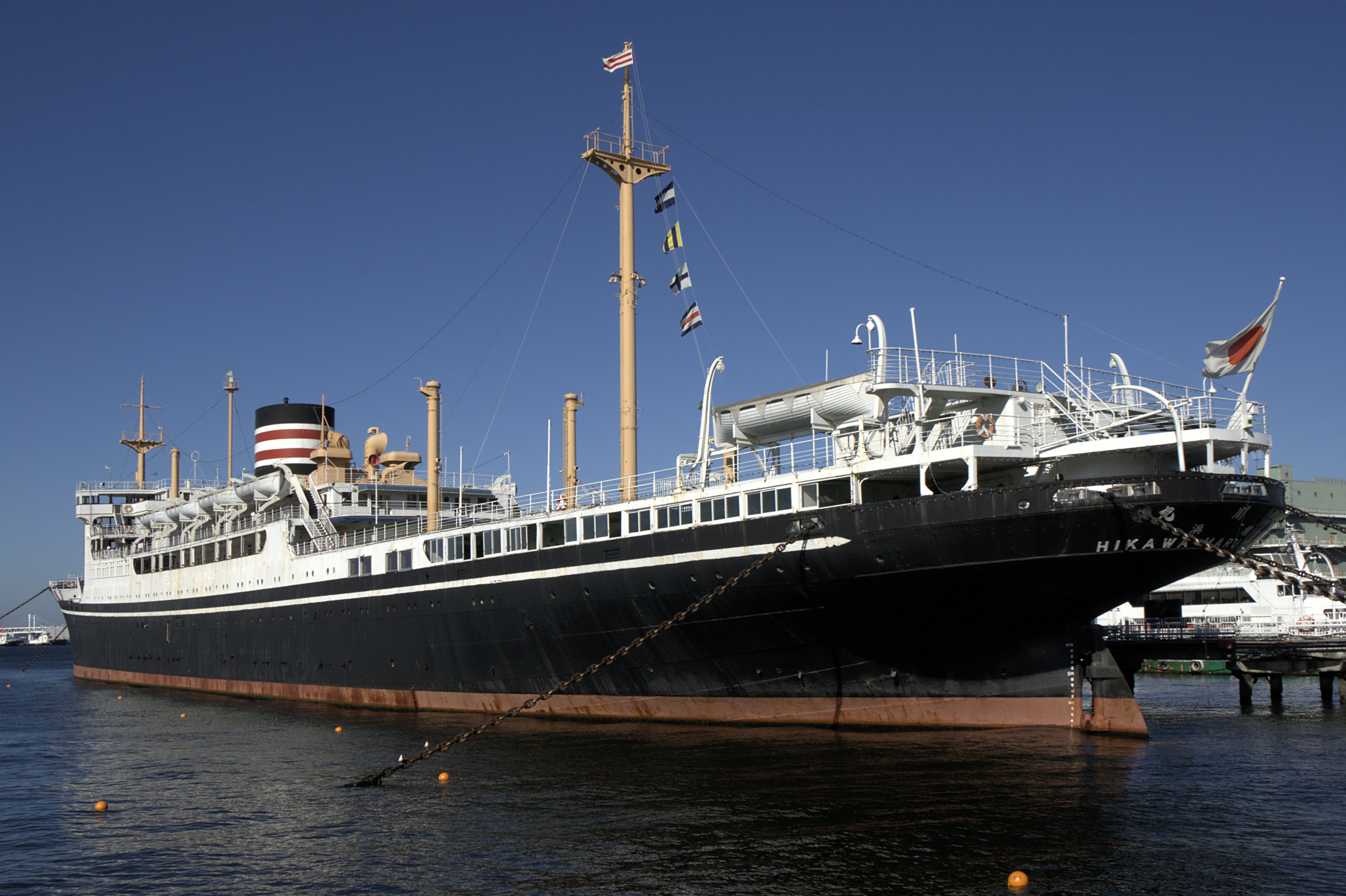

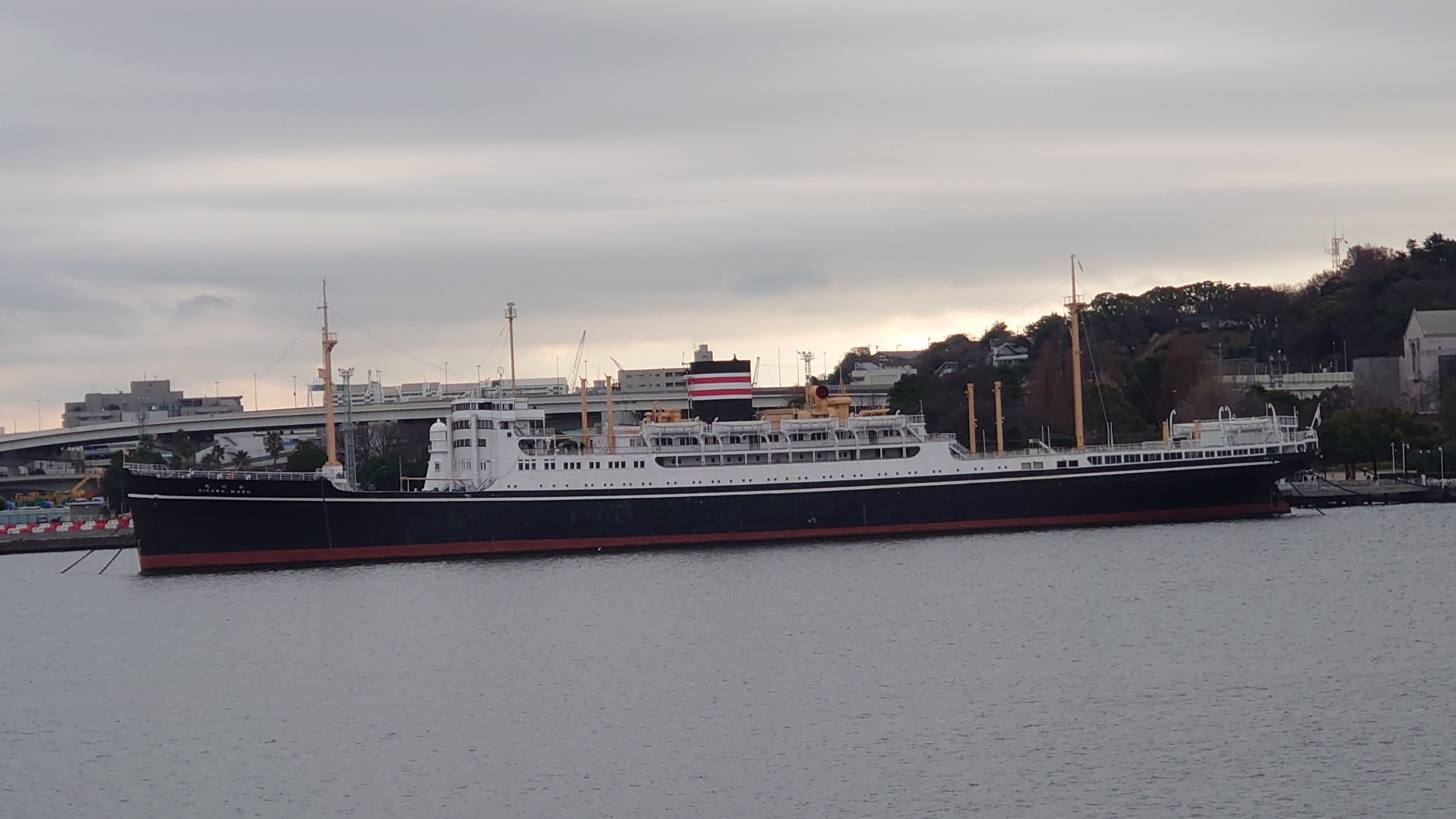

== See also ==
- Hikawa Maru Monogatari (2015)
- List of existing 20th century cruise ships and liners
  Ships that are berthed
  - RMS Queen Mary (Long Beach, California) - As a hotel
  - Queen Elizabeth 2 (Dubai) - As a hotel
  - Minghua (former Ancerville) (Shenzhen) - As a hotel
