= Auriga Leader =

Japanese car carrier ship built in 2008

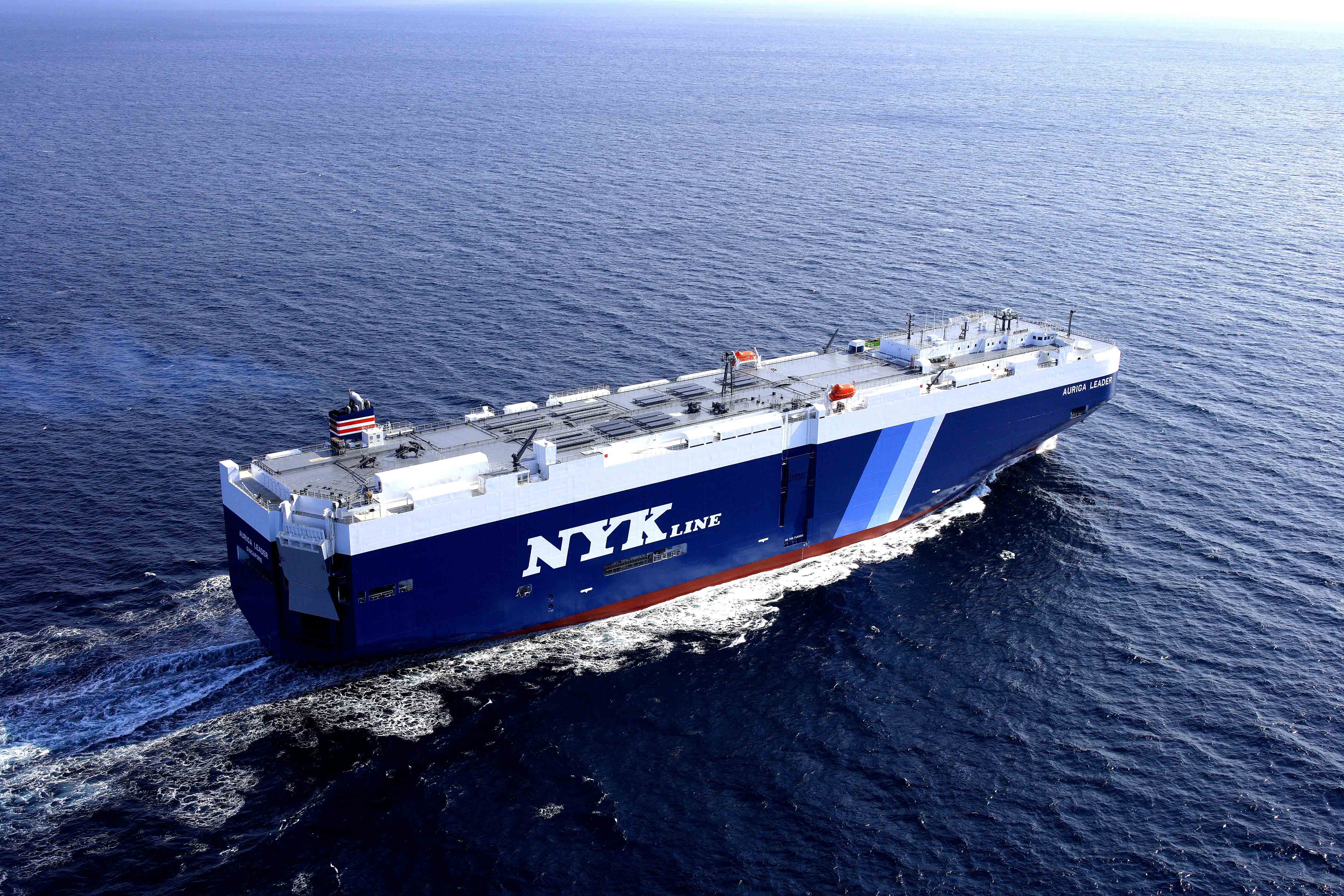

History

Singapore
- Name: Auriga Leader
- Operator: Nippon Yusen Kaisha, Nippon Oil
- Builder: Mitsubishi
- Completed: 2008
- Identification: IMO number: 9402718; MMSI number: 564268000; Callsign: 9VHF4

General characteristics
- Class & type: Car carrier
- Tonnage: 18,758 metric tons (deadweight tonnage); 60,213 gt
- Length: 199.99 m (656.1 ft)
- Beam: 32.26 m (105.8 ft)
- Depth: 34.52 m (113.3 ft)
- Capacity: 6,200 cars

Auriga Leader is a car carrier, owned by Nippon Yusen Kaisha, and used for mobile machinery and cars worldwide; for example, Mitsubishi vehicles from Japan to the rest of the world. A small amount of the ship's power is produced by photovoltaic panels.

== Experimental ==
Nippon Yusen Kaisha and Nippon Oil developed the Auriga Leader partly as an experimental vessel, where it is supposed to gather statistical research in how solar power can assist in powering a ship at sea. The ship's experimental stage was planned for two years.

=== Results ===
The solar panels produced 1.4 times more energy on the ship at sea than on land in Tokyo. It is not known what factors had an impact on this, but it is suggested that being at sea means more sunlight and that the wind encountered cools off the panels and thus increases efficiency.

== Efficiency ==
The Auriga Leader's solar power capabilities produced an anticipated 0.05% of the ship's propulsion power and 1% of its electrical usage. This will contribute to lowering the ship's fuel usage by approximately 13 tonnes and its CO_{2} output by 40 tonnes per year.
