= Hikawa Maru-class ocean liner =

Class of Japanese ocean liners

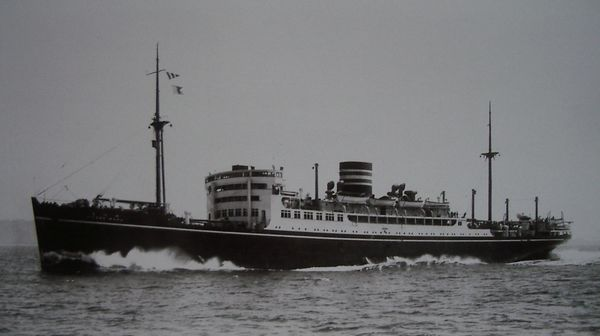
- Hikawa Maru on 22 March 1930

Class overview
- Name: Hikawa Maru class ocean liners
- Builders: Yokohama Dock Company; Ōsaka Iron Works
- Operators: Nippon Yūsen (NYK Line); Government of Japan; (Empire of Japan) Imperial Japanese Navy (IJN)
- Cost: Hikawa Maru and Hie Maru; 6,550,000 JPY; Heian Maru; 6,650,000 JPY
- Built: 1928 – 1930
- In commission: 1930 – 1960
- Planned: 3
- Completed: 3
- Lost: 2
- Retired: 1
- Preserved: 1

General characteristics
- Type: Ocean liner
- Tonnage: Hikawa Maru 11,622 grt; Hie Maru 11,621 grt; Heian Maru11,615 grt
- Length: 163.3 m (535 ft 9 in) overall
- Beam: 20.1 m (65 ft 11 in)
- Draught: 12.5 m (41 ft 0 in)
- Propulsion: 2 × B&W-Ikegai diesels; 2 shafts; Hikawa Maru; 11,000 bhp; Hie Maru; 13,122 bhp; Heian Maru; 13,404 bhp
- Speed: Hikawa Maru; 18.2 knots (20.9 mph; 33.7 km/h); Hie Maru; 18.5 knots (21.3 mph; 34.3 km/h); Heian Maru; 18.4 knots (21.2 mph; 34.1 km/h)
- Capacity: Hikawa Maru and Hie Maru; 331 passengers (76 first class, 69 tourist class, 186 third class); Heian Maru; 330 passengers (76 first class, 69 tourist class, 185 third class)
- Crew: 130
- Armament: Hie Maru and Heian Maru, 1942; 4 × 150 mm (5.9 in) L/40 naval guns; 4 × 13 mm AA guns

The Hikawa Maru-class ocean liner (氷川丸型貨客船, Hikawa Maru-gata Kakyakusen) was a class of ocean liners of Japan, serving during the 1930s, and after World War II.

== Background ==
In 1927–28, the NYK Line placed an order for eight ocean liners to reinforce the Japan–Seattle route (3 × Hikawa Maru class), Japan–San Francisco route (3 × Asama Maru class), and Japan–London route (2 × Terukuni Maru class). The Hikawa Maru class were named the Hikawa Maru, Hiye Maru (later Hie Maru) and Heian Maru.

== Service ==
Hikawa Maru was completed on 25 April 1930. Her maiden voyage was 13 May 1930 for Yokohama–Seattle. Arrived at Seattle on 27 May. She sailed 73 times until August 1941. Her service was popular, and the cuisine was well-regarded, as NYK Line employed a chef trained in Europe.

Hie Maru was completed on 31 July 1930. Her maiden voyage was 23 August 1930 from Kobe.

Heian Maru was completed on 24 November 1930. Her maiden voyage was 18 December 1930 from Hong Kong.

All of them were enlisted by the Imperial Japanese Navy (IJN) in October–November 1941.

=== Ships in class ===
Name	Builder	Laid down	Launched	Completed	Note
Hikawa Maru (氷川丸)	Yokohama Dock Company	9 November 1928	30 September 1929	25 April 1930	She was taken up by the Navy on 21 November 1941.
Hiye Maru / Hie Maru (日枝丸)	Yokohama Dock Company	25 May 1929	12 February 1930	31 July 1930	Her name spelling was changed Hie Maru in 1938. She was enlisted by the Navy in 1940.
Heian Maru (平安丸)	Ōsaka Iron Works, Sakurajima Factory	19 July 1929	16 April 1930	24 November 1930	She was taken by the Navy on 15 October 1941.

== Service in World War II ==
- Hikawa Maru was classified to auxiliary hospital ship on 1 December 1941, and she was assigned to the 4th Fleet.
- Hie Maru was classified to auxiliary submarine tender on 15 February 1942, and she was assigned to the 6th Fleet.
- Heian Maru was classified to auxiliary submarine tender on 15 October 1941, and she was assigned to the 6th Fleet.
- 17 November 1943, Hie Maru was sunk by USS Drum.
- 18 February 1944, Heian Maru was sunk by air raid at Chuuk.
- 10 August 1946, Hikawa Maru survived war, and she was reverted to the NYK Line.

=== Ships in class as naval vessel ===
Name	Career	Fate
Hikawa Maru	Classified to auxiliary hospital ship on 1 December 1941. Reverted to NYK Line on 10 August 1946.	Retired on 21 December 1960. She is now anchored at Port of Yokohama.
Hie Maru	Classified to auxiliary transport in 1940. Reverted to NYK Line in October 1940. Enlisted by the Ministry of Foreign Affairs on 22 September 1941. Enlisted by the Navy on 26 November 1941, classified the auxiliary transport. Classified to auxiliary submarine tender on 15 February 1942. Classified to auxiliary transport on 1 October 1943.	Sunk by USS Drum at southwest of Truk 01°45′N 148°45′E on 17 November 1943.
Heian Maru	Classified to auxiliary submarine tender on 15 October 1941.	Sunk during the Operation Hailstone on 18 February 1944.

== Photos ==
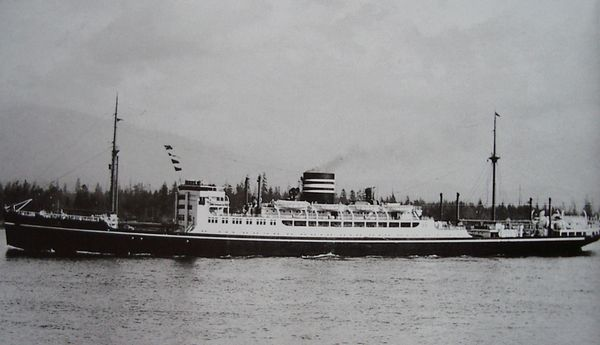
NYK Line Hie Maru

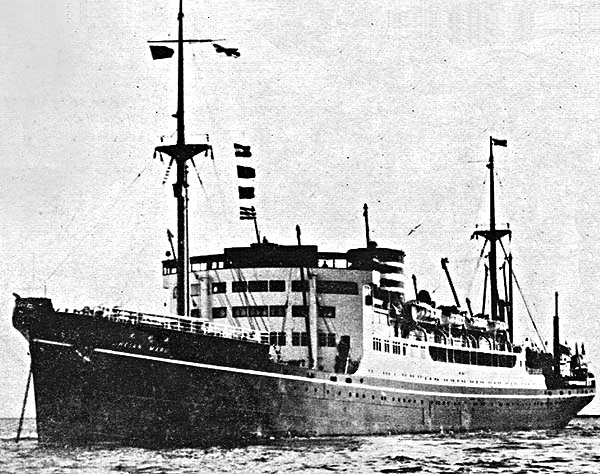
NYK Line Heian Maru in 1937

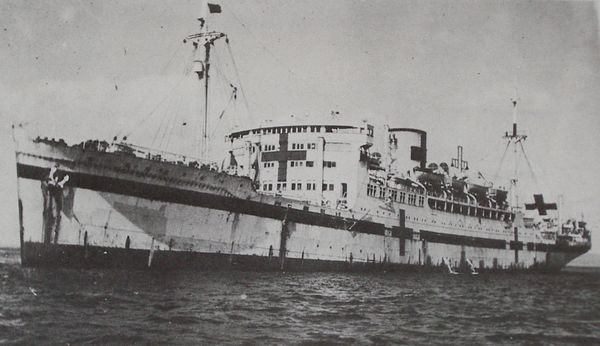
IJN Hikawa Maru in wartime

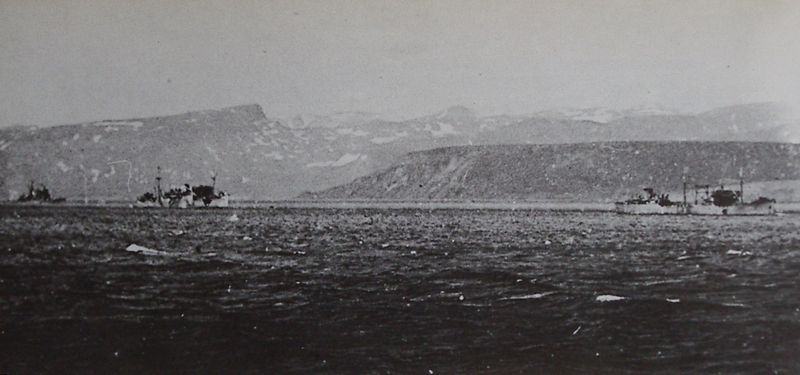
IJN Heian Maru (center) in May 1943

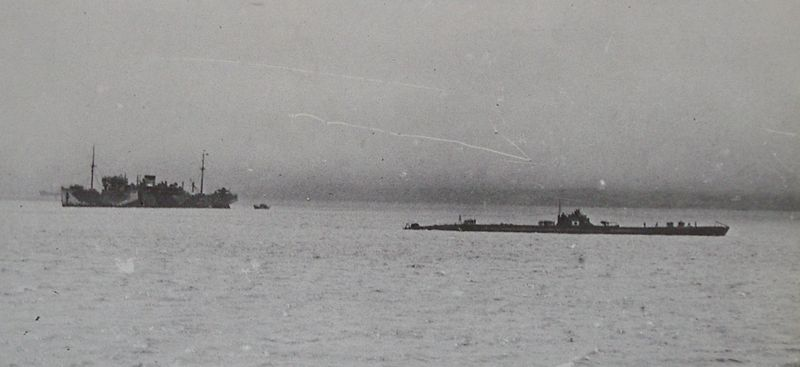
IJN Heian Maru in June 1943

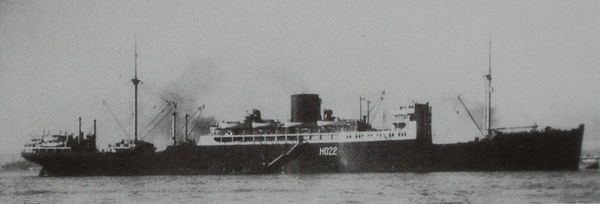
NYK Line Hikawa Maru in 1947

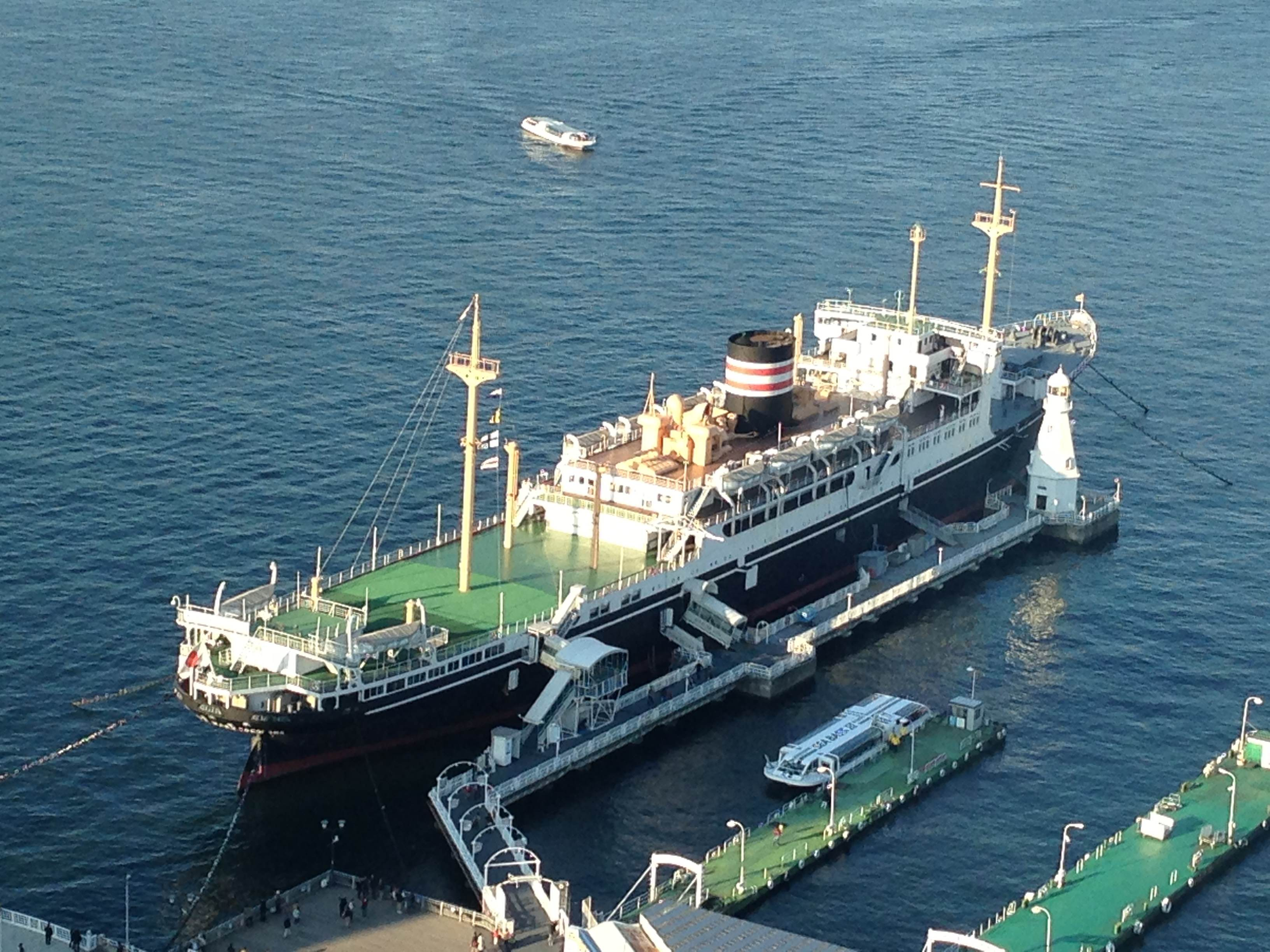
Hikawa Maru in the 21st century

== See also ==
- Asama Maru class ocean liner
- Terukuni Maru class ocean liner

== Bibliography ==
- Tashirō Iwashige, The visual guide of Japanese wartime merchant marine, "Dainippon Kaiga". Archived from the original on 2002-12-07. (Japan), May 2009
- Ships of the World special issue, The Golden Age of Japanese Passenger Liners, "Kaijinsha"., (Japan), May 2004
- Voyage of a Century "Photo Collection of NYK Ships", "Nippon Yūsen"., (Japan), October 1985
- The Maru Special, Japanese Naval Vessels No.29, "Japanese submarine tenders w/ auxiliary submarine tenders", "Ushio Shobō". (Japan), July 1979
- The Maru Special, Japanese Naval Vessels No.53, "Japanese support vessels", Ushio Shobō (Japan), July 1981
