= Terukuni shrine =

Shinto shrine in Kagoshima, Kagoshima Prefecture, Japan

Terukuni jinja 照国神社
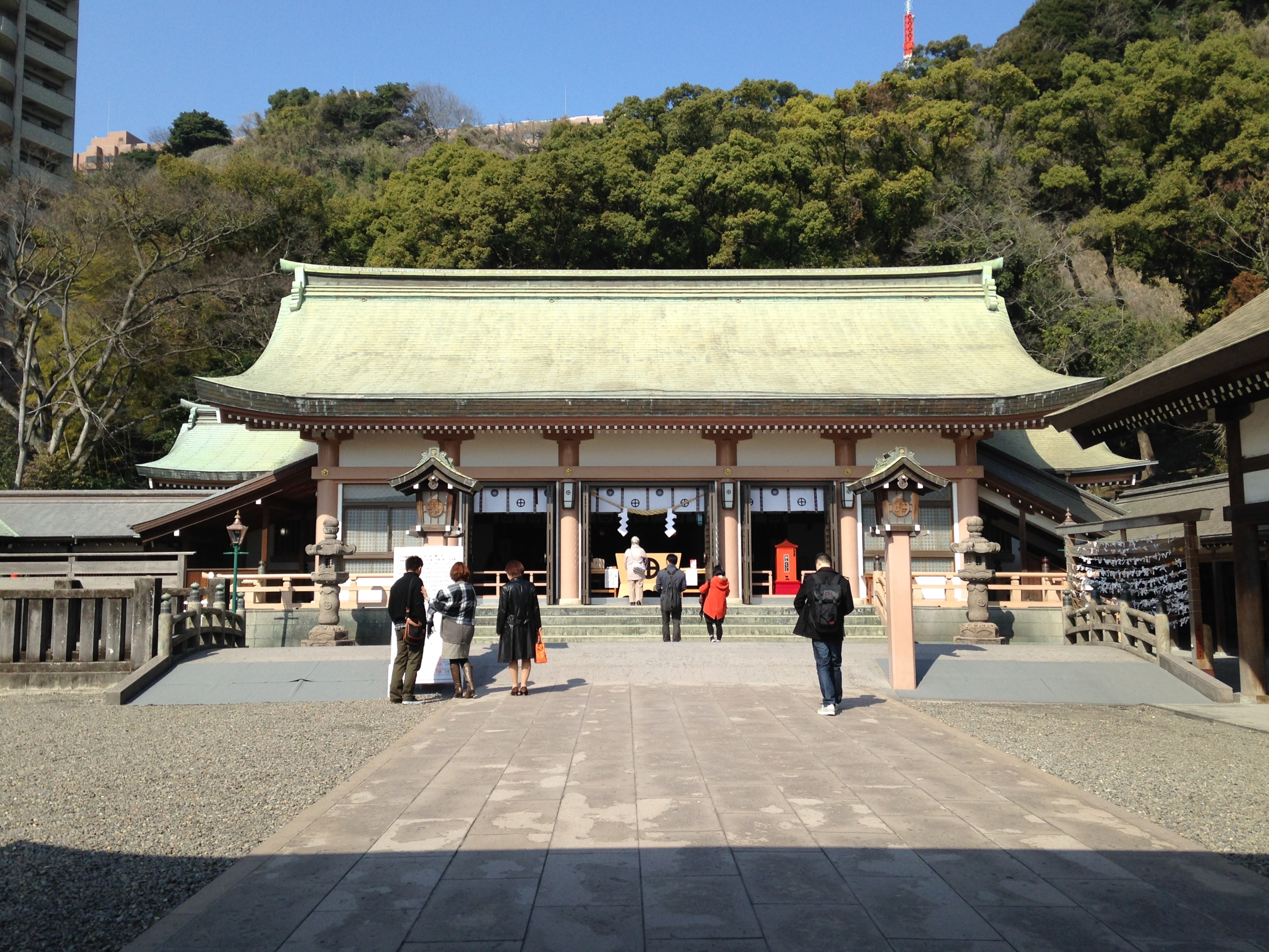
- Terukuni shrine precincts

- Location within Japan

Religion
- Affiliation: Shinto
- Deity: Shimazu Nariakira

Location
- Location: 19-35, Terukuni-chō, Kagoshima; Kagoshima prefecture 892-0841
- Coordinates: 31°35′41.3″N 130°33′0.3″E

Architecture
- Established: 1882

Website
- www.terukunijinja.jp

Terukuni jinja (照国神社) is a Shinto shrine in the city of Kagoshima in Kagoshima Prefecture in Japan. This shrine is considered to be a dwelling place for the kami of Shimazu Nariakira, whose posthumous name is Terukuni Daimyōjin (照国大明神).

== History ==
The shrine was founded in Kyushu in 1882 during the Meiji period.

This class of shrine (Bekkaku Kanpeisha) was established in 1872 (Meiji 5) for the veneration of those kami who were, during life, ordinary subjects of the Emperor. Only a very small number of shrines were designated as such.

== See also ==
- List of National Treasures of Japan (crafts: swords)
- Terukuni Maru class ocean liner
