= Terukuni Maru-class ocean liner =

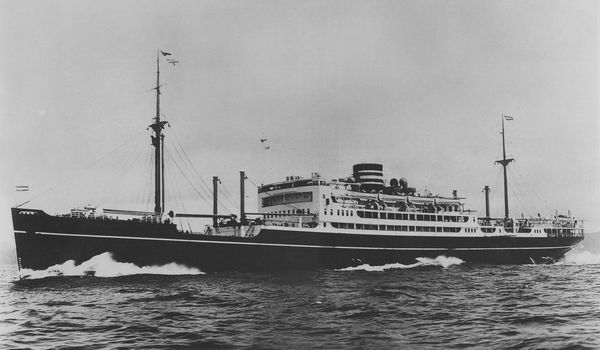
- NYK Line Terukuni Maru

Class overview
- Name: Terukuni Maru class
- Builders: Mitsubishi Heavy Industries
- Operators: Nippon Yūsen (NYK Line); Imperial Japanese Navy
- Cost: 6,177,000 JPY
- Built: 1929 – 1930
- In commission: 1930 – 1944
- Planned: 2
- Completed: 2
- Lost: 2

General characteristics
- Type: Ocean liner
- Tonnage: Terukuni Maru 11,931 GRT; Yasukuni Maru 11,933 GRT
- Length: 160.5 m (526 ft 7 in) overall
- Beam: 19.5 m (64 ft 0 in)
- Draught: 11.3 m (37 ft 1 in)
- Propulsion: 2 × Sulzer diesels, 2 shafts; 10,000 bhp cruising; 14,368 bhp full boost
- Speed: Terukuni Maru; 17.8 knots (20.5 mph; 33.0 km/h); Yasukuni Maru; 18.0 knots (20.7 mph; 33.3 km/h)
- Capacity: 249 passengers (121 first class, 68 tourist class, 60 third class)
- Crew: 177
- Armament: Yasukuni Maru, 1941; 4 × 150 mm (5.9 in) L/40 naval guns; 4 × 13.2 mm (0.52 in) AA guns

The Terukuni Maru-class ocean liner (照國丸型貨客船,, Terukuni Maru-gata Kakyakusen) was a class of ocean liners of Japan, serving during the 1930s, and into World War II.

== Background ==
In 1925, the Swedish American Line constructed the passenger liner MS Kungsholm. The Nippon Yusen Kabushiki Kaisha (日本郵船,, NYK Line) was concerned about Kungsholm's construction. In 1927–28, the NYK Line placed an order for eight ocean liners to reinforce the Japan–Seattle route (three Hikawa Maru class), Japan–San Francisco route (three Asama Maru class), and Japan–London route (two Terukuni Maru class). The Terukuni Maru class were named Terukuni Maru (照國丸) and Yasukuni Maru (靖國丸).

== Service ==
=== Terukuni Maru ===
- 9 January 1929: Laid Down at Mitsubishi Heavy Industries, Nagasaki Shipyard.
- 19 December 1929: Launched.
- 31 May 1930: Completed.
- 30 June 1930: Maiden voyage for Yokohama–London.
- (after): She sailed 24 times until September 1939.
- 24 September 1939: The 25th sailing to London.
- 19 November 1939: Arrived off South Downs. She anchored here till minesweeping of the River Thames by Royal Navy was over.
- 08:30, 21 November 1939: Weigh anchor.
- 12:53: She struck a naval mine at 51°50′N 01°30′E.
- 13:35: Sunk.

The wreck lay on its side, partly submerged and visible to wartime shipping in the Thames Estuary area.

=== Yasukuni Maru ===
- 22 April 1929: Laid Down at Mitsubishi Heavy Industries, Nagasaki Shipyard.
- 15 February 1930: Launched.
- 31 August 1930: Completed.
- 22 September 1930: Maiden voyage for Yokohama–London.
- (after): She sailed many times until October 1939.
- 25 October 1939: Enlisted by the Navy. Classification to the Auxiliary transport.
- 11 December 1939: Discharged.
- 29 October 1940: Enlisted by the Navy. 30 October, armament fitted in Kure Naval Arsenal.
- 16 December 1940: Classification to the Auxiliary submarine tender.
- 11 January 1941: Fitting out was completed, and assigned to the 1st Submarine Division, 6th Fleet.
- 20 December 1941: Assigned to the 3rd Submarine Division, 6th Fleet.
- 1 February 1942: Bombed by Task Force 8 (USS Enterprise) at Kwajalein.
- 1 March 1942: Arrived at Kure Naval Arsenal and repairs were started.
- 23 April 1942: Repairs were completed. Sailed to Truk and Kwajalein.
- 15 September 1943: Assigned to the 6th Fleet.
- 31 January 1944: Sunk by USS Trigger at northwest off Truk 09°15′N 147°13′E.
- 10 March 1944: Removed from naval ship lists, and discharged.

== Photos ==
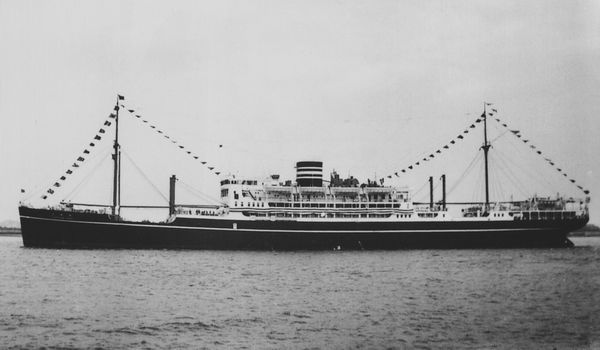
NYK Line Yasukuni Maru in 1930

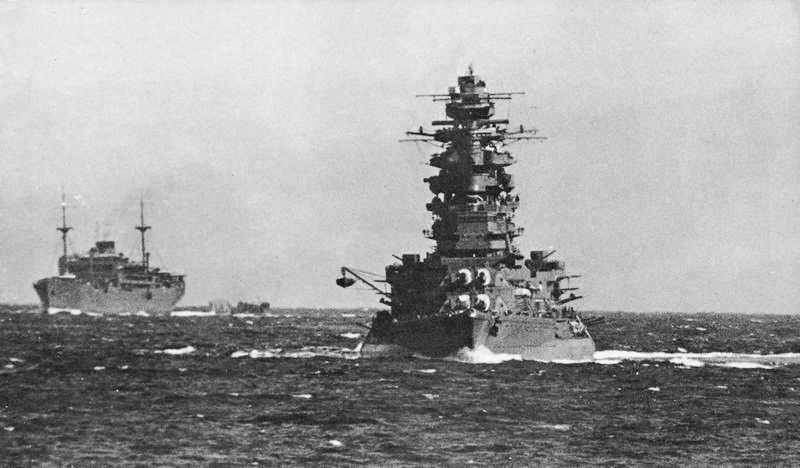
(left) Yasukuni Maru in 1941

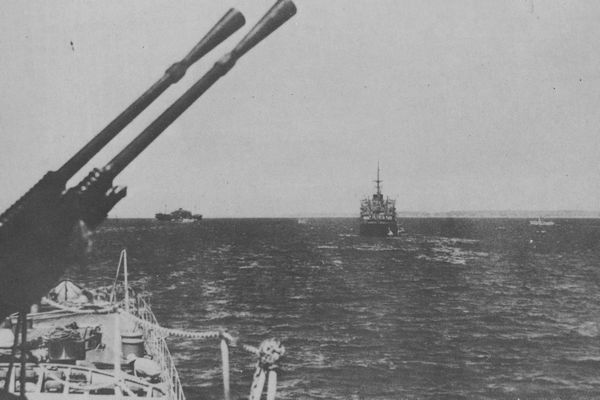
(center) Yasukuni Maru in 1942

== See also ==
- Foreign commerce and shipping of the Empire of Japan

== Bibliography ==
- Tashirō Iwashige, The visual guide of Japanese wartime merchant marine, "Dainippon Kaiga". Archived from the original on 2002-12-07. (Japan), May 2009
- Ships of the World special issue, The Golden Age of Japanese Passenger Liners, "Kaijinsha"., (Japan), May 2004
- Voyage of a Century "Photo Collection of NYK Ships", "Nippon Yūsen"., (Japan), October 1985
- The Maru Special, Japanese Naval Vessels No.29, "Japanese submarine tenders w/ auxiliary submarine tenders", "Ushio Shobō". (Japan), July 1979
