= Nippon Yusen =

Japanese shipping line

Nippon Yusen Kabushiki Kaisha

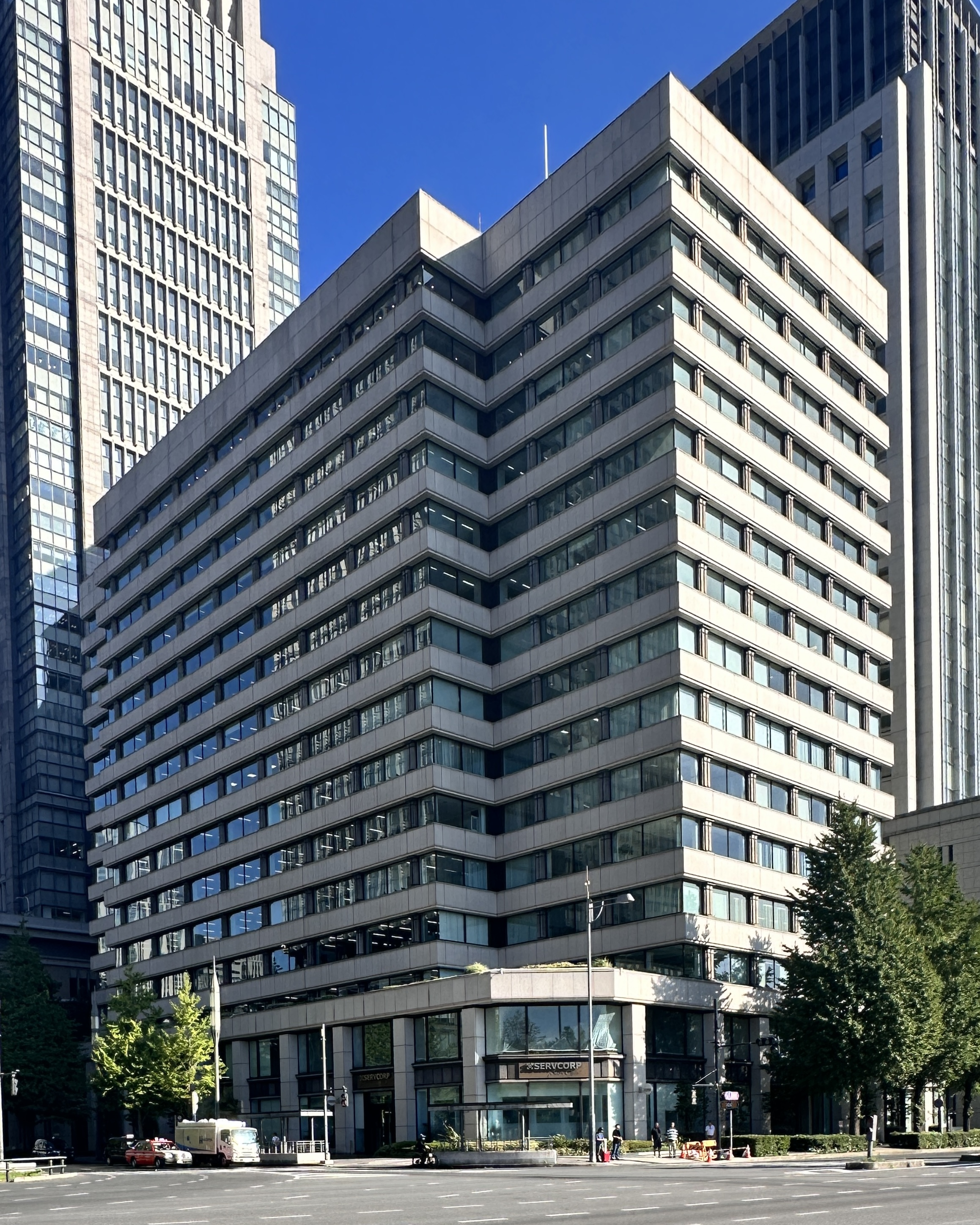
- Yusen Building, headquarters in Marunouchi, Chiyoda, Tokyo
- Native name: 日本郵船株式会社
- Type: Public
- Traded as: TYO: 9101; Nikkei 225 Component
- Industry: Transportation
- Founded: September 29, 1885; 141 years ago
- Headquarters: Marunouchi, Chiyoda, Tokyo, Japan
- Key people: Hitoshi Nagasawa (chairman, Director); Takaya Soga (president)
- Products: Marine transportation; Air transportation; Cruises; Terminal and harbor transport; Shipping-related services
- Revenue: ▼JP¥ 1,829 billion (US$ 16.5 billion) — FY 2019
- Net income: ▲JP¥ 60.3 billion (US$ 543.4 million) — FY 2019
- Number of employees: 35,711 (as of March 31, 2019)
- Website: nyk.com

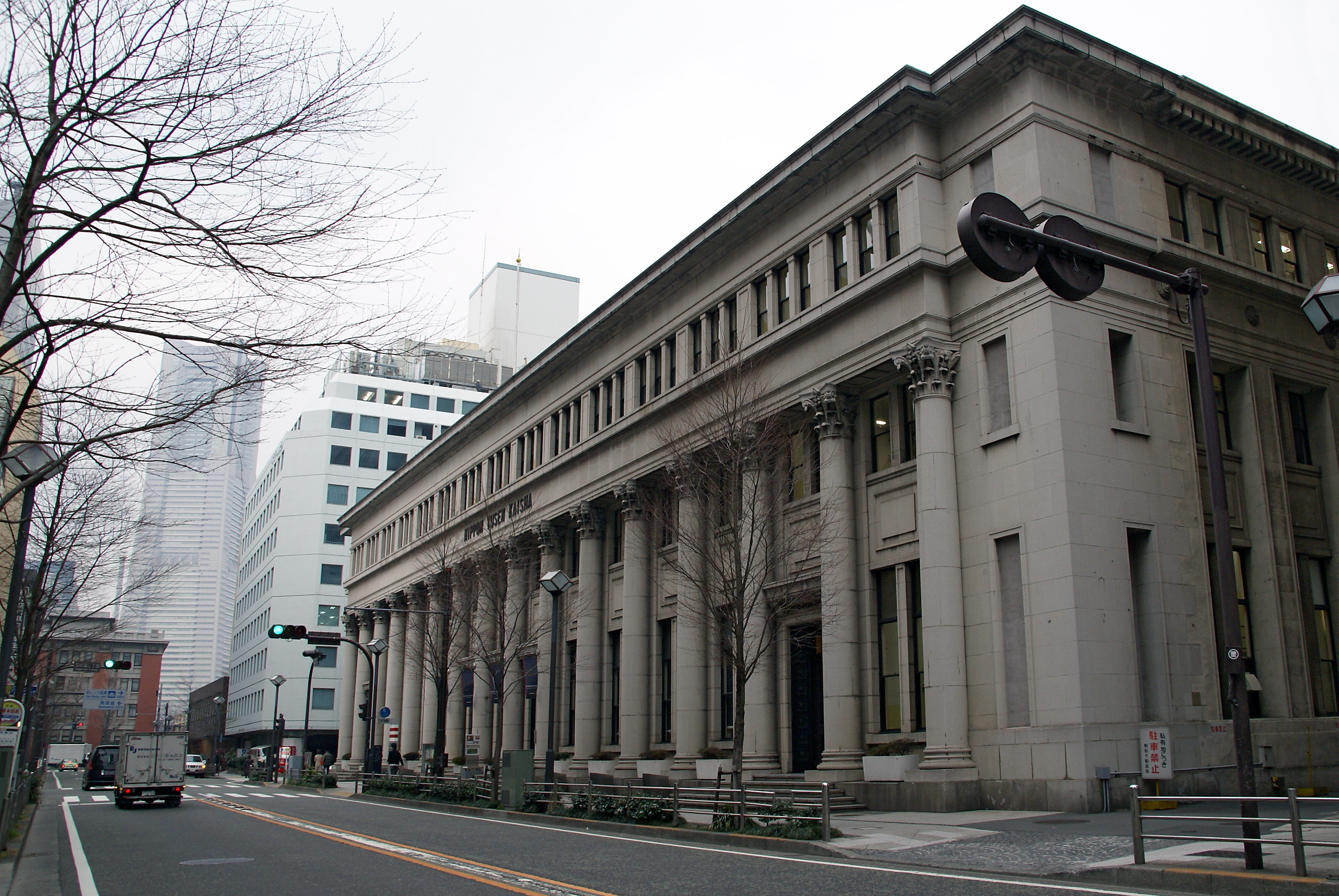
NYK Maritime Museum and NYK's Yokohama branch

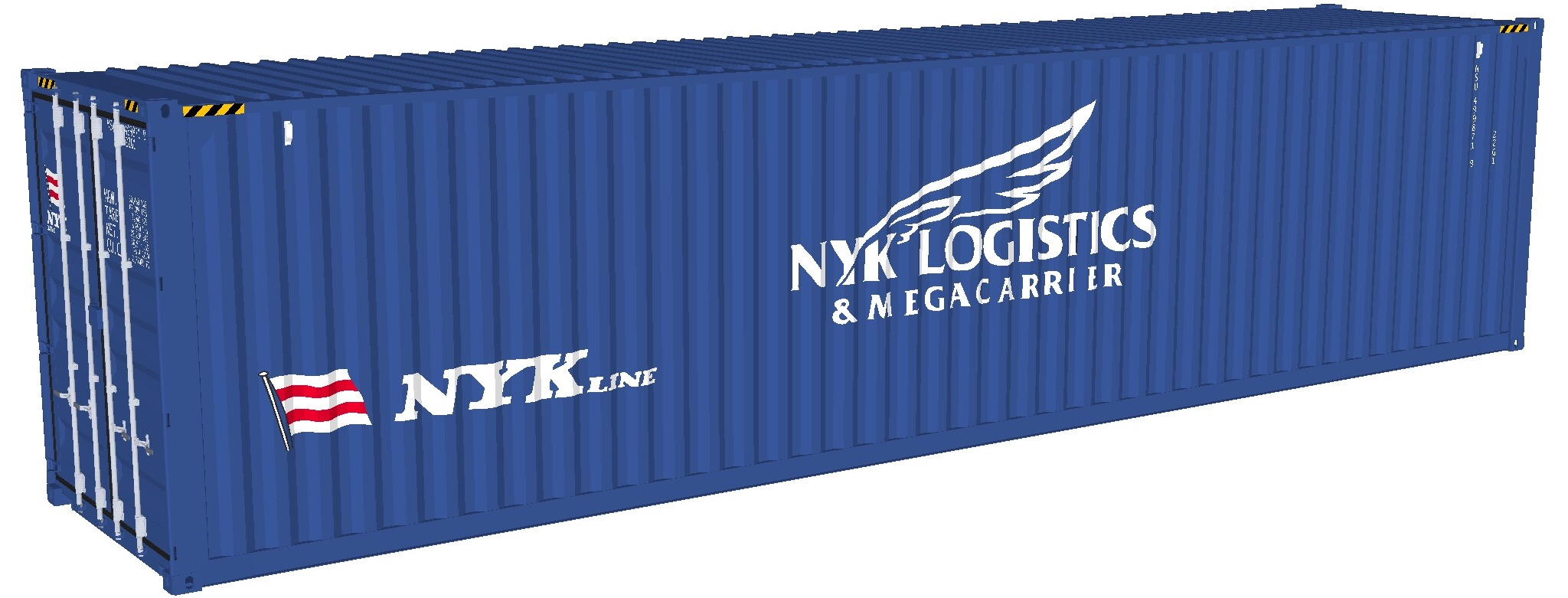
NYK Line container

The Nippon Yusen Kabushiki Kaisha (日本郵船株式会社, Nippon Yūsen kabushiki kaisha; lit. 'Japan Mail Ship Company'), also known as NYK Line, is a Japanese shipping company. The company headquarters are located in Chiyoda, Tokyo, Japan. It operates a fleet of over 820 ships, which includes container ships, tankers, bulk and woodchip carriers, roll-on/roll-off car carriers, reefer vessels, LNG carriers, and cruise ships. It is a member of the Ocean Network Express and Mitsubishi Group.

== History ==
=== 1870-1900 ===
The company traces its history back to the Tsukumo Shokai shipping company founded by the Tosa clan in 1870. In 1875, as the renamed Mitsubishi Shokai, the company inaugurated Japan's first passenger liner service, with a route from Yokohama to Shanghai; in that same year, the company name was changed to Mitsubishi Mail Steamship Company. In 1885, a merger with Kyodo Unyu Kaisha (founded 1882) led to the adoption of the company's present name.

The merged company had a fleet of 58 steamships and expanded its operations rapidly, first to other Asian ports and then worldwide, with a line service to Seattle established in 1896 and to London in 1899.

The company's Katori Maru was used by Chinese Muslims to travel to Singapore on their way to Mecca for the Hajj in 1925. From there, the company had the pilgrims travel on board other Japanese steamships to Suez and then to Mecca. The company promised to take responsibility for all the necessary formalities and helped contact other local transportation agencies that could take the pilgrims to Mecca. Chinese pilgrims were promised a 20% discount for their tickets. A third-class ticket that sold for £5/10/0 would be £4/8/0, while a second-class ticket sold for £14/0/0 would be sold for £11/5/0.

=== 1900-1945 ===
The majority of Japanese merchant ships, tankers, and liners sailed under the NYK banner in this period. Regular services linked Kobe and Yokohama with South America, Batavia, Melbourne, and Cape Town, with frequent crossings to San Francisco and Seattle. Other routes connected local Chinese cabotage vessels on the Chinese coasts and upper Yangtze River.

Ocean routes went east from Japan to Vancouver (Canada) or Seattle. Another way was to stop in Hawaii, which continued to San Francisco and the Panama Canal. The next commercial routes were south from Japan, across the East China Sea. These went to Southeast Asia, the China coasts, and towards India and the Indian Ocean, to Europe or Batavia (Dutch Indies), or Australia and New Zealand. The fastest services took 10 days from Yokohama to Seattle, and one month to Europe.

Local sea routes connected 78 home seaports (38 open to foreign trade). Yokohama, Kobe, and Osaka had the greatest importance for trading with Japan. These ports had the third, fourth, and eighth place in net tonnage registered in the world. Coal passed from Moji to Osaka and Yokohama. Karafuto timber represented a third part of local trade. Soybean products from Dairen and Ryojun arrived at Yokohama. The sugarcane of the South Seas Mandate and Formosa, cotton, salt, and minerals represented other important parts of these transport transactions. In 1926, Toyo Kisen Line (TKK), with its fleet of nine ships, merged with NYK. The current funnel livery was introduced in 1929. The company also ran services connecting metropolitan Japan to its exterior provinces (Chosen, Karafuto, Kwantung, Formosa and South Mandate) of the Empire.

From 1924, all new cargo ships for NYK were motor ships. NYK introduced its first passenger motor ships in 1929, but continued to buy a mixture of steam and motor passenger ships until 1939.

In World War II, the NYK Line provided military transport and hospital ships for the Imperial Japanese Army and Navy. Many vessels were sunk by the Allied navies, and installations and ports were attacked from the air. Only 37 NYK ships survived the war. The company lost 185 ships in support of military operations in the Pacific. Before the war, NYK had 36 passenger ships; by the time of Japan's surrender only one, the motor ship Hikawa Maru, survived.

NYK's surviving vessels and equipment were confiscated by the Allied authorities as reparations, or taken by recently liberated Asian states in 1945–46. Shipping Control Authority for the Japanese Merchant Marine requisitioned Hikawa Maru as a transport ship to repatriate Japanese soldiers and civilians from territories that had been liberated from Japanese occupation.

=== Fleet until 1945 ===
The NYK tonnage expanded in bursts, responding to changes economic conditions and perceived changes in the market for passenger liner travel. The evolution of the fleet mirrors some of those developments. In the following lists, the dates of maiden voyages are indicated with each ship's name.

Amongst the many ships in the early NYK fleet, some names comprise serial categories. Some ships were named after Shinto shrines, and others were named after ancient provinces of Japan, cities of Japan, mountains of Japan or islands of Japan. Some ships had explicitly non-Japanese names, such as ships named after cities.

Shinto shrines
Chichibu Maru (1930).
Hie Maru (1930).
Heian Maru (1930).
Hikawa Maru (1930).
Kasuga Maru (1940).
Kitano Maru (1909).
Nitta Maru (1939).
Tatsuta Maru (1930).
Terukuni Maru (1930).
Yawata Maru (1939)

Provinces
Awa Maru (1899).
Awa Maru (1943).
Kaga Maru (19__).
Noto Maru (1934).
Tango Maru (1905).

Mountains
Asama Maru (1929).
Maya Maru (1925).
Rokko Maru (1923).

Cities
Asuka Maru (1924).
Calcutta Maru (1917).
Dakar Maru (1920).
Durban Maru (1920).
Hakone Maru (1921)
Lima Maru (1920).
Lisbon Maru (1920).
Lyons Maru (1920).

Miscellaneous
Bokuyo Maru
Korea Maru (1901).
Kyushu Maru (1862).
Rosetta Maru (1900).
Siberia Maru (1901).
Taiyō Maru (1911).
Toyama Maru (1915).
Yoshida Maru (1941).

=== Fleet in post-war era ===
The modern NYK tonnage encompasses a variety of ship names. Some names form series, as in those ships named after flowers, stars, star constellations, and provinces of pre-Meiji Japan.

Flowers
ACX Cherry (1994)
ACX Hibiscus (1997)
ACX Jasmine (1996)
ACX Lily (1990)
ACX Magnolia (1998)
ACX Marguerite (1997)
ACX Salvia (1997)
Plumeria Leader (2022)

Stars
Altair Leader (2011)
NYK Altair (2010)
NYK Canopus (1998)
NYK Deneb (2007)
NYK Rigel (2009)
NYK Sirius (1998)
NYK Vega (2006)
Rigel Leader (2011)

Constellations
Andromeda Leader (2007)
Aphrodite Leader (2007)
Apollon Leader (2007)
Aries Leader (2014)
Auriga Leader (2008)
Cepheus Leader (2006)
Cetus Leader (2005)
Equuleus Leader (2005)
NYK Antares (1997)
NYK Leo (2002)
NYK Orion (2008)
NYK Pegasus (2003)
NYK Phoenix (2003)
NYK Virgo (2007)
Volans Leader (2003)

Provinces
Iga Maru (1996)
Izu Maru (1997)
Izumo Maru (1997)
Kaga Maru (1988)
Sanuki Maru (1997)
Settsu Maru (1997)
Shima Maru (1997)

Miscellaneous
Asama Maru (1954)
Astoria Maru (1952)
Galaxy Leader (2002)
Hakone Maru (1968)
Hikawa Maru (1974)
Zeus Leader (2009)

=== 1950-present ===
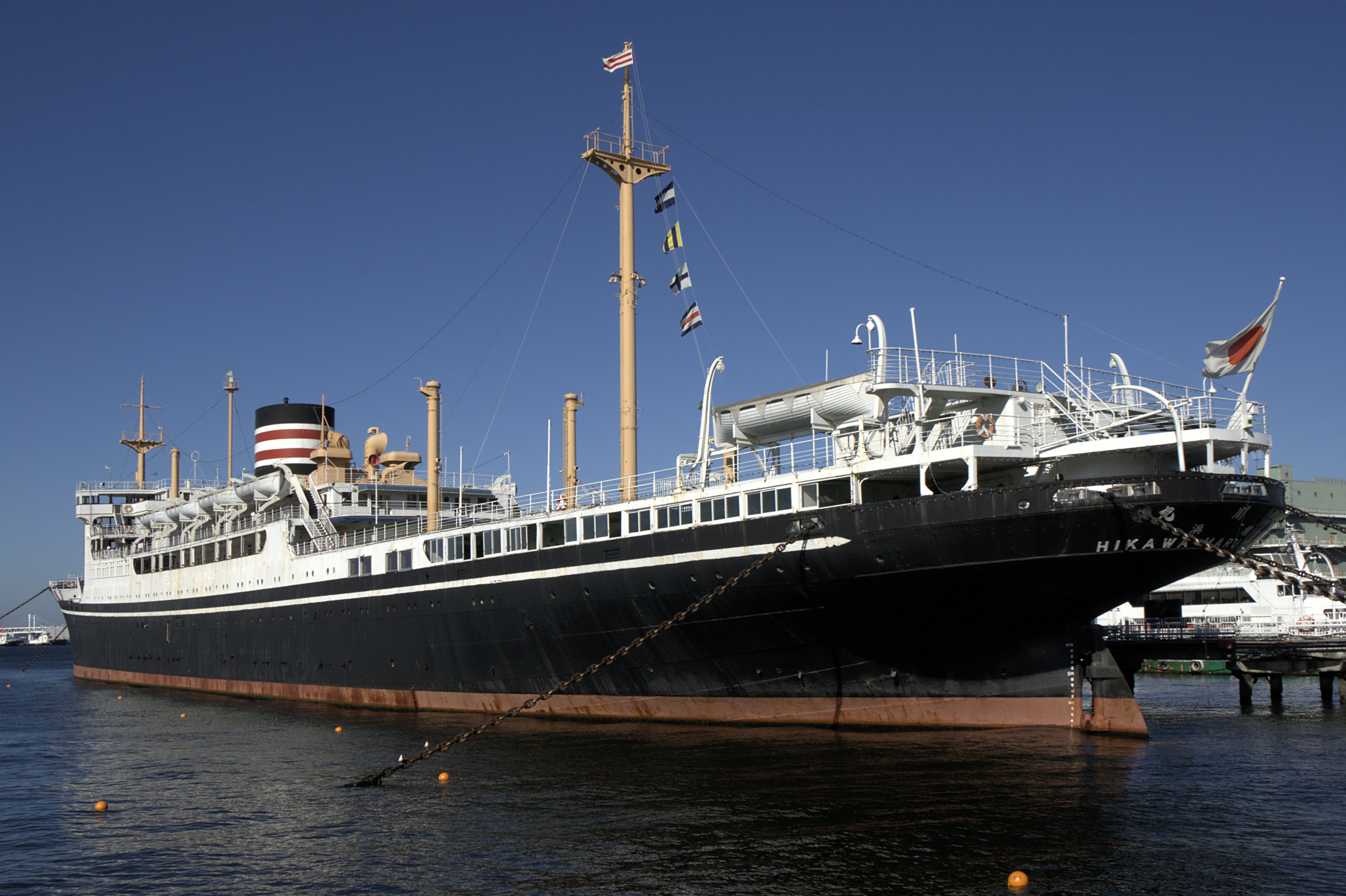
The NYK liner Hikawa Maru preserved at Naka-ku, Yokohama

By the mid-1950s NYK ships were again seen around the world.

The advent of jets meant that people were no longer interested in taking ocean liners. In 1960 NYK ended ocean liner services.

As the demand for passenger ships dwindled in the 1960s, NYK expanded its cargo operation, running Japan's first container ship Hakone Maru on a route to California in 1968 and soon establishing container ship routes to many other ports. NYK became a partner in Nippon Cargo Airlines in 1978,

Following the enactment of the U.S. Shipping Act of 1984, NYK shifted its focus towards mass intermodal transportation, including: (1) enlarged container ships in the trade, (2) NYK owned/operated container terminals at the U.S. West Coast gateways, and (3) participation in US inland transportation by introducing the operation of mile-long Double Stack Trains (two-tier container freight train service across the U.S., in collaboration with U.S. railway companies)."

NYK Line decided to enter the world-wide luxury cruise ship market and established Crystal Cruises Inc. in Los Angeles.

In July 1990 the first post-war cruise passenger ship Crystal Harmony has been completed (Mitsubishi Heavy Industries Nagasaki), and she marked the beginning of services of Crystal Cruises. (Los Angeles to Alaska and returned to San Francisco) The sister ship of Crystal Harmony, Crystal Symphony (built at Finland: Kvaerner Masa), commenced operation in Mediterranean cruises. The third ship of Crystal Cruises, Crystal Serenity (France: Chantiers de l'Atlantique), commenced operation in Europe. Crystal Harmony was sold from Crystal Cruises to NYK Cruises and began operation as Asuka II. Crystal Cruises was sold to Genting Hong Kong.

In May 2021 NYK Line became the first Japanese shipping firm to join the Sustainable Shipping Initiative's Ship Recycling Transparency Initiative, which incorporates the Hong Kong International Convention for the Safe and Environmentally Sound Recycling of Ships.

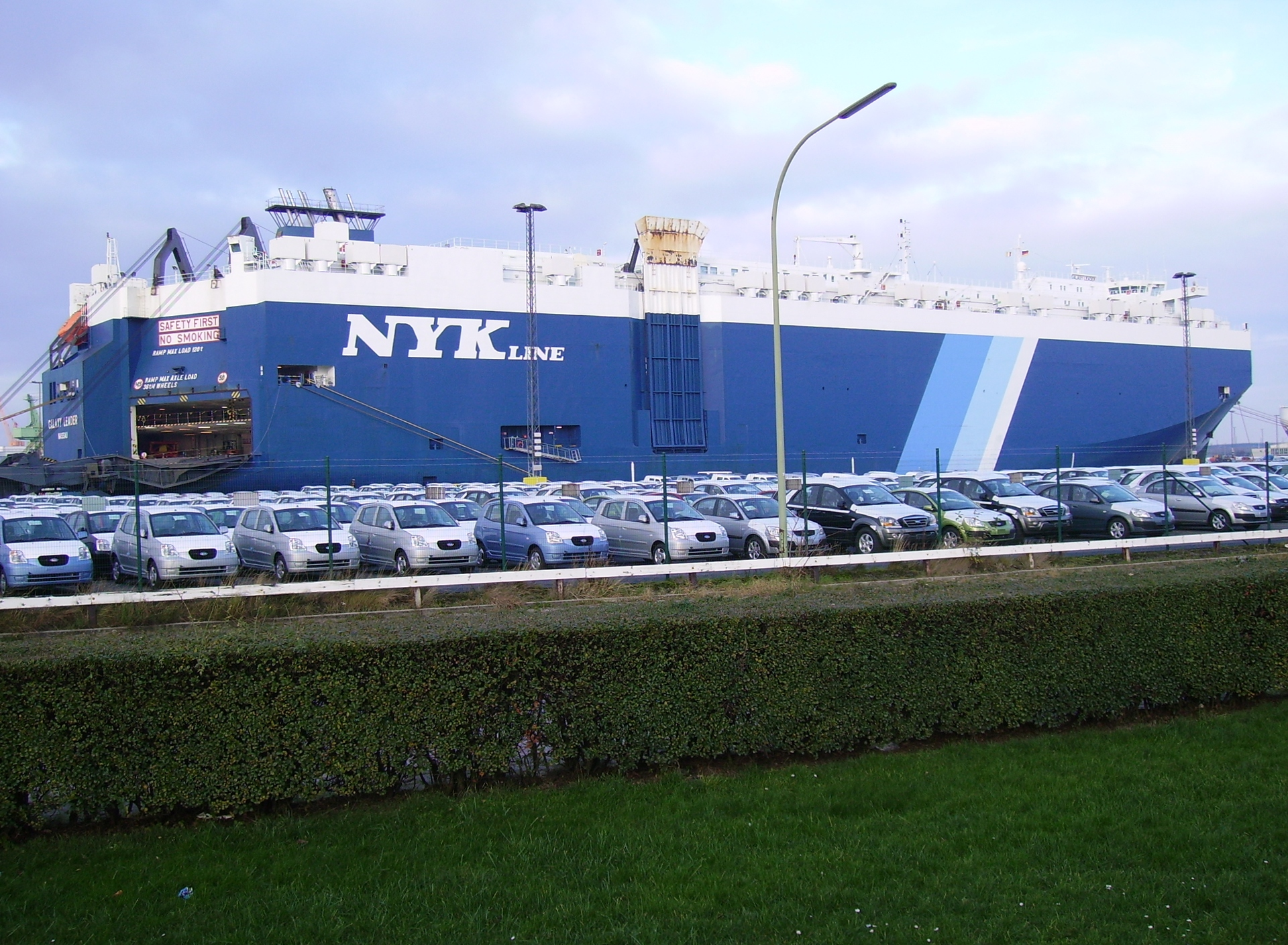
The NYK car carrier Galaxy Leader

On 19 November 2023, the NYK operated vessel Galaxy Leader, while sailing in Red Sea en route to India, was hijacked by the Iranian backed Houthi on the grounds it was an Israeli owned vessel. In May 2024 the owners asked the Houthis to release the crew.

== Merger of container operations ==
On Monday, 31 October 2016, Kawasaki Kisen Kaisha, Mitsui OSK Lines and Nippon Yusen Kaisha agreed to merge their container shipping business by establishing a completely new joint venture company. The integration included their overseas terminal activities. The new company operates under the name "Ocean Network Express" (ONE), with the company headquarters in Japan (Tokyo), a global business operations headquarters in Singapore and regional headquarters in United Kingdom (London), United States (Richmond, VA), Hong Kong, and Brazil (São Paulo). They started operations on 1 April 2018.

== Container vessels fleet ==
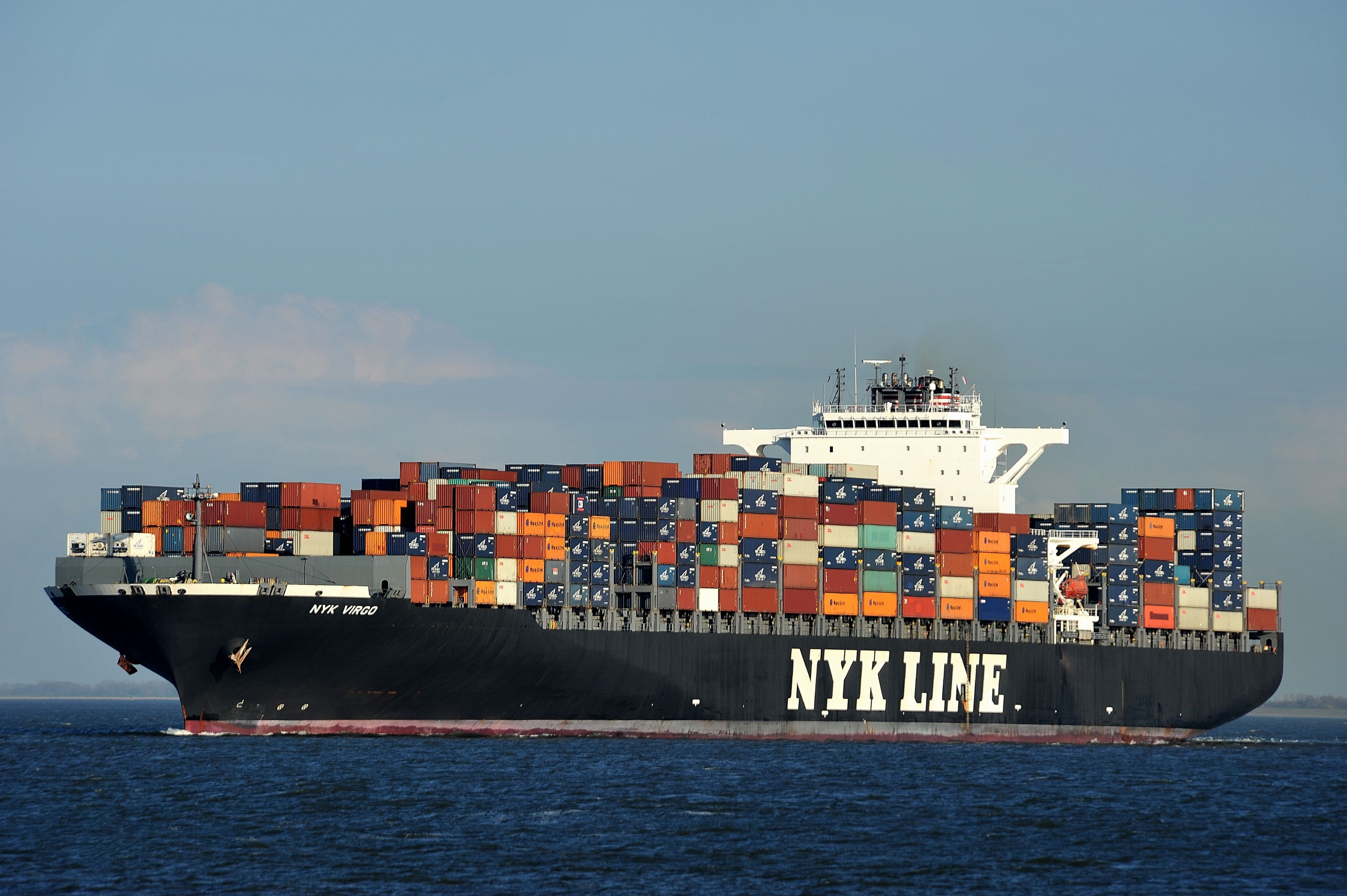
NYK Virgo

Container ship classes of NYK Line
Ship class	Built	Capacity (TEU)	Ships in class	Notes
NYK Vega-class	2006–2007	9,012	4	Operated by Ocean Network Express
NYK Oceanus-class	2007–2008	8,628–9,040	4	Operated by Ocean Network Express
NYK Adonis-class	2010–2011	9,592	3	Operated by Ocean Network Express
NYK Bird-class	2016–2019	14,000	15	Operated by Ocean Network Express

== Roll-on/roll-off division ==
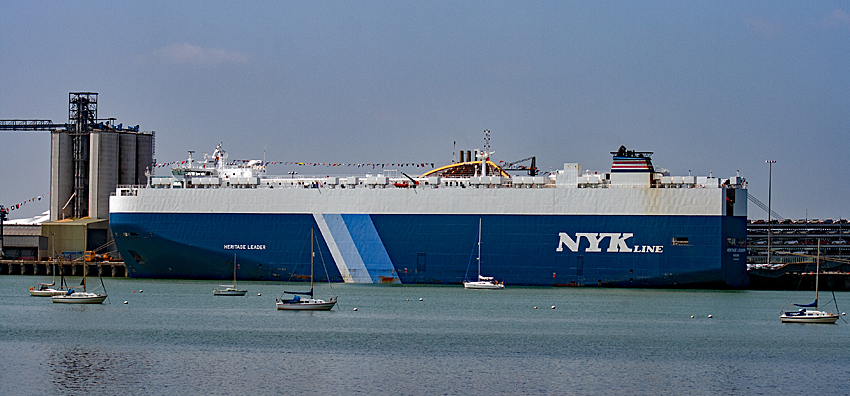
Heritage Leader vehicle carrier at Southampton

NYK is also the world's largest roll-on/roll-off ocean carrier. NYK's RORO fleet has a 660,000 car capacity which represents just over 17% of the global car transportation fleet capacity. Over 123 vessels are deployed worldwide transporting cars manufactured in Japan, US, EU towards Asia, Middle East, North & South America, Australia, Africa and Europe. In addition to brand new cars, High and Heavy cargo (such as excavators, mobile cranes, new and used trucks and buses, trailers, Mafi roll trailers) and break bulk static pieces are carried all over the globe by NYK.

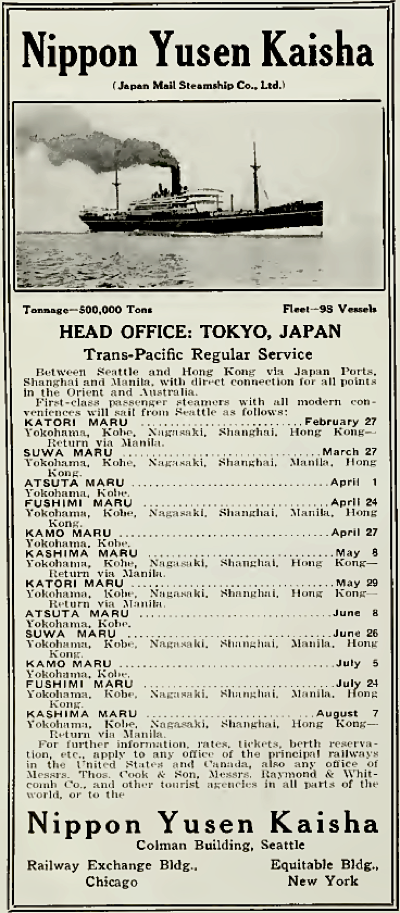
Advertisement of Seattle, Washington sailings, March 1918

Advertisement circa 1930s

Advertisement circa 1935

== See also ==
- Hikawa Maru-class ocean liner
- New Carissa
- Terukuni Maru-class ocean liner
- Nitta Maru-class cargo liner
