= Walter Desmond =

American judge

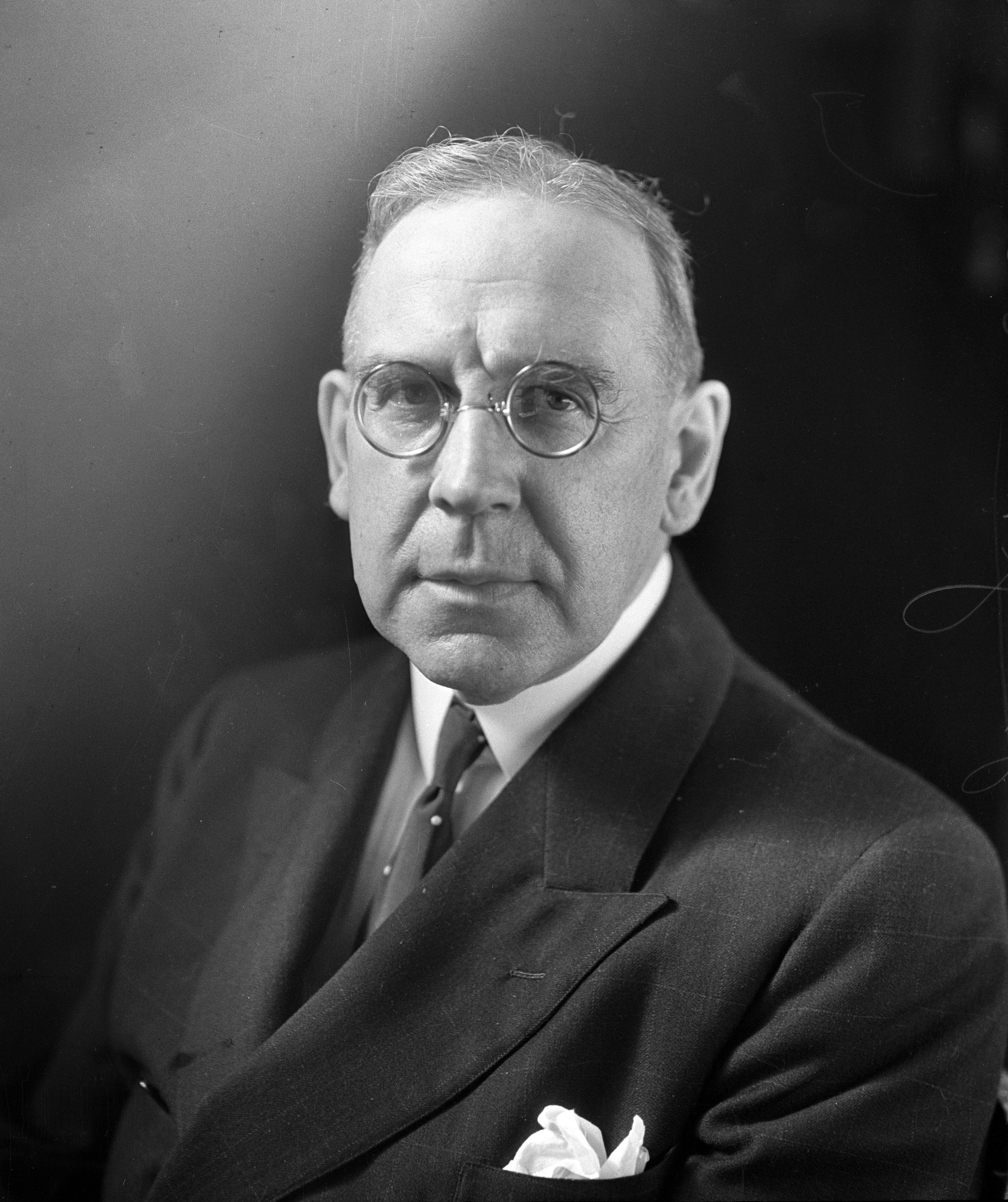

Presiding Justice of the California Court of Appeal, Second District, Division Three
- In office January 2, 1943 – July 1, 1948
- Appointed by: Culbert Olson
- Preceded by: B. Rey Schauer
- Succeeded by: Clement Lawrence Shinn

Personal details
- Born: February 3, 1876 Worcester, Massachusetts, U.S.
- Died: May 13, 1951 (aged 75) Long Beach, California, U.S.
- Education: Harvard University; Harvard Law School

Walter J. Desmond (February 3, 1876 – May 13, 1951) was a lawyer, Postmaster, and Public Works Commissioner in Long Beach, California before serving as a Judge on the Los Angeles County Superior Court and the California Court of Appeal.

Born to Irish immigrants in Worcester, Massachusetts, Desmond graduated from Harvard University in 1898 and Harvard Law School in 1901. He practiced law in Boston for four years before moving to Long Beach, California in 1905. He was admitted to the California State Bar in February 1906, and opened a law office in town. When oil was discovered in Signal Hill in 1921, a large part of his practice was devoted to drawing oil leases. He served as Long Beach Postmaster and was later appointed Public Works Commissioner for the City of Long Beach.

He was appointed Judge in the Los Angeles Superior Court by Governor C.C. Young on August 3, 1927, and served until April 11, 1934, when he took an appointment from Governor Rolph as an Associate Justice for the California Court of Appeal, Second Appellate District, Division 3. After serving for a little more than six months in that position, he accepted an appointment to return to the bench on the Los Angeles Superior Court by Governor Merriam on November 1, 1934. On January 2, 1943, he was appointed Presiding Justice of the California Court of Appeal, Second Appellate District, Division 3 by Governor Olson. He retired from the bench on July 1, 1948.

Desmond died at the age of 75 in Long Beach, California on May 13, 1951.

The Knights of Columbus Council #3449, located at 5459 Atlantic Avenue in Long Beach, is named after Judge Walter Desmond. Judge Desmond is a founding member of Knights of Columbus Council #987.

His son Walter Jr. (1909–2007) was an attorney and judge for nearly 60 years in Long Beach. He served as president of the Long Beach Bar Association, and as a judge pro tem of the Long Beach Municipal Court from 1970 to 1983.

Another son, Gerald (1915–1964), was a prominent Democratic politician and civic leader who served as a Long Beach City Councilmember and as Long Beach City Attorney. The Gerald Desmond Bridge which opened in 1968 and connects Terminal Island and Long Beach, was named in his honor.

His great-grandson, Michael Desmond, serves as Chief Counsel at the Internal Revenue Service in Washington, D.C. He was nominated for the position in March 2018, confirmed by the United States Senate on February 27, 2019, and sworn into office on March 4, 2019.
