= Vincent Thomas Bridge =

Suspension bridge in Los Angeles, California, United States

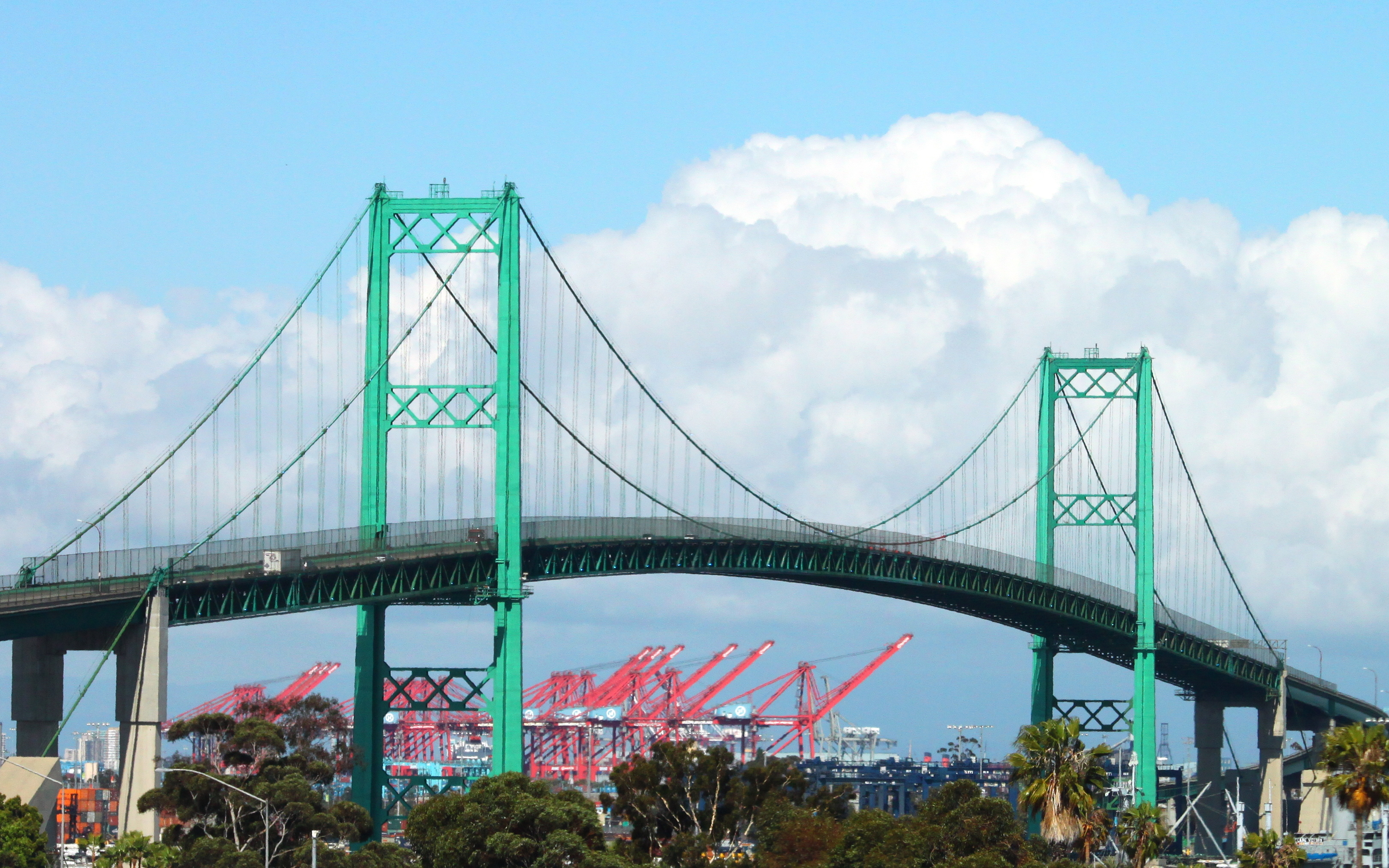
- View from San Pedro towards Terminal Island, 2009
- Coordinates: 33°44′58″N 118°16′18″W
- Carries: 4 lanes of SR 47
- Crosses: Los Angeles Harbor
- Locale: Los Angeles (San Pedro and Terminal Island)
- Owner: State of California
- Maintained by: California Department of Transportation
- ID number: 53 1471

Characteristics
- Design: Suspension bridge
- Total length: 6,060 feet (1,847 m)
- Width: 52 feet (16 m) (typical)
- Height: 365 feet (111 m)
- Longest span: 1,500 feet (457 m)
- Clearance below: Approximately 185 feet (56 m)

History
- Opened: November 15, 1963; 62 years ago

Statistics
- Daily traffic: 32,000

Location
- Interactive map of Vincent Thomas Bridge

The Vincent Thomas Bridge is a 1,500-foot-long (460 m) suspension bridge, crossing Los Angeles Harbor in Los Angeles, California, linking San Pedro with Terminal Island. It is the only suspension bridge in the Greater Los Angeles area. The bridge is part of State Route 47, which is known as the Seaside Freeway. The bridge opened in 1963 and is named for California Assemblyman Vincent Thomas of San Pedro, who championed its construction. Its chief engineer was William "Jim" Jurkovich who was instrumental in bringing pre-stress concrete bridge design to California. It was the first welded suspension bridge in the United States and is now the fourth-longest suspension bridge in California and the 76th-longest span in the world. The clear height of the navigation channel is approximately 185 feet (56 m).

== History ==
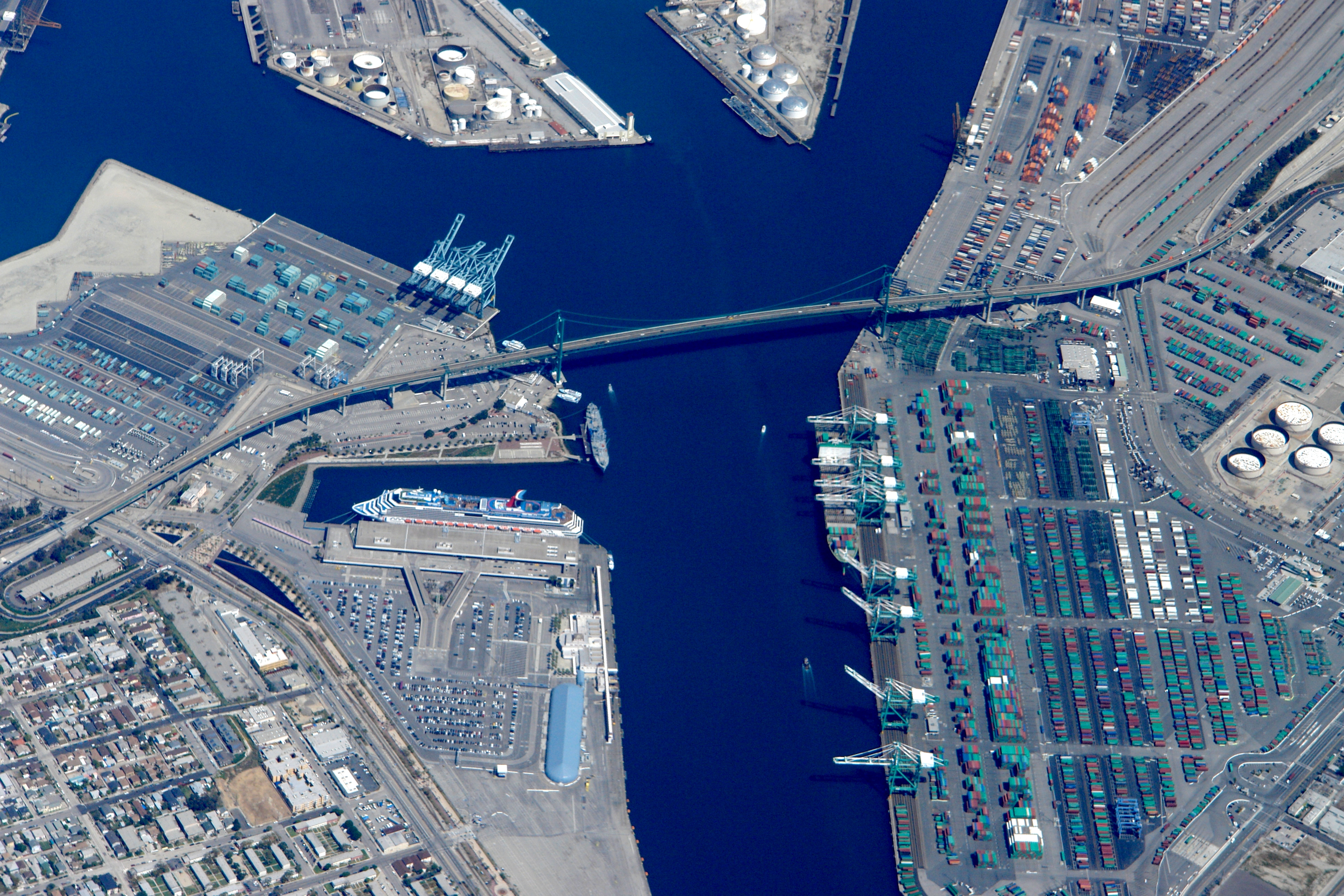
The bridge viewed from 11,500 feet (3,500 m). The Victory-class ship SS Lane Victory is also visible, moored between a cruise ship and the bridge.

The bridge's construction was advocated by state assemblyman Vincent Thomas, who represented San Pedro. He spent 19 years beginning in 1940 arguing for the 16 different pieces of legislation that were necessary for the bridge's construction. During that time and in the years right after it was built, it was ridiculed as "the bridge to nowhere".

Other bridges to the island included the 1948 Commodore Heim lift bridge connecting SR 47 north and a WWII pontoon bridge from Ocean Boulevard to Long Beach (replaced in 1968 by the through arch Gerald Desmond Bridge and again in 2020 by the cable-stayed Long Beach International Gateway). Until the through arch bridge's 1963 construction, ferry service from San Pedro was important to cannery and shipyard workers on Terminal Island; private ferries had begun in 1870, and municipal ferry service had begun in 1941. Some residents, including many women who worked at the canneries, tried unsuccessfully to keep one of the smaller pedestrian-only ferries operating after the new bridge's opening because the ferry was available at any time including night-shift hours but the new bus service involved long waits.

In 1961, before the bridge opened in 1963, the California State Legislature passed Concurrent Resolution 131, naming the bridge after Thomas. At the time of it passing, he was the longest-serving assemblyman. It is the only suspension bridge in the world supported entirely on piles.

In 1968, the bridge was connected through SR 47 directly into the Harbor Freeway (then-signed as SR 11 and later as Interstate 110); having the bridge and connection available was cited by port officials as crucial to the port's success in the era of containerized cargo. The cargo from the San Pedro side of the Port of Los Angeles travels over the Vincent Thomas bridge, onto the Terminal Island Freeway, to the southern end of the Long Beach Freeway (then-signed as SR 7 and later as Interstate 710), and then up to the rail yards of East Los Angeles.

At the 25th anniversary of its opening in 1988, events were held to raise money for $170,000 of permanent decorative lights for the bridge's main cables. In January 2005, after seventeen years of planning and fundraising, the decorative illumination was changed to 160 blue LED lamps, powered by solar panels, with a project cost of $1 million.

In 2023, the California Department of Transportation (Caltrans) made a proposal to an approximately $706 million plan to replace the bridge's road decking. The project was scheduled to begin in January 2026 and is slated to finish in advance of the LA 2028 Olympic and Paralympic Games. As part of the project, the bridge is currently closed to traffic for 16 months between November 2026 and March 2028 while deck is being replaced.

== Tolls ==
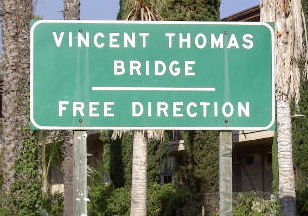
Eastbound entrance from N. Harbor Blvd., San Pedro, California as of September 2011

When the bridge opened in 1963, the toll was 25 cents (equivalent to $2.63 in 2025) in each direction, with the toll plaza on the Terminal Island side. In 1983, the toll increased to 50 cents (equivalent to $1.62 in 2025) for westbound traffic but became free for eastbound traffic. In 2000, tolls were eliminated on the Vincent Thomas Bridge, leaving the San Diego–Coronado Bridge as the only remaining toll bridge in Southern California. After the San Diego-Coronado Bridge stopped collecting tolls in 2002, the California Department of Transportation was able to devolve authority over toll bridges to the Bay Area Toll Authority in June 2005.

The toll plaza houses California Highway Patrol facilities.

== Popular culture ==
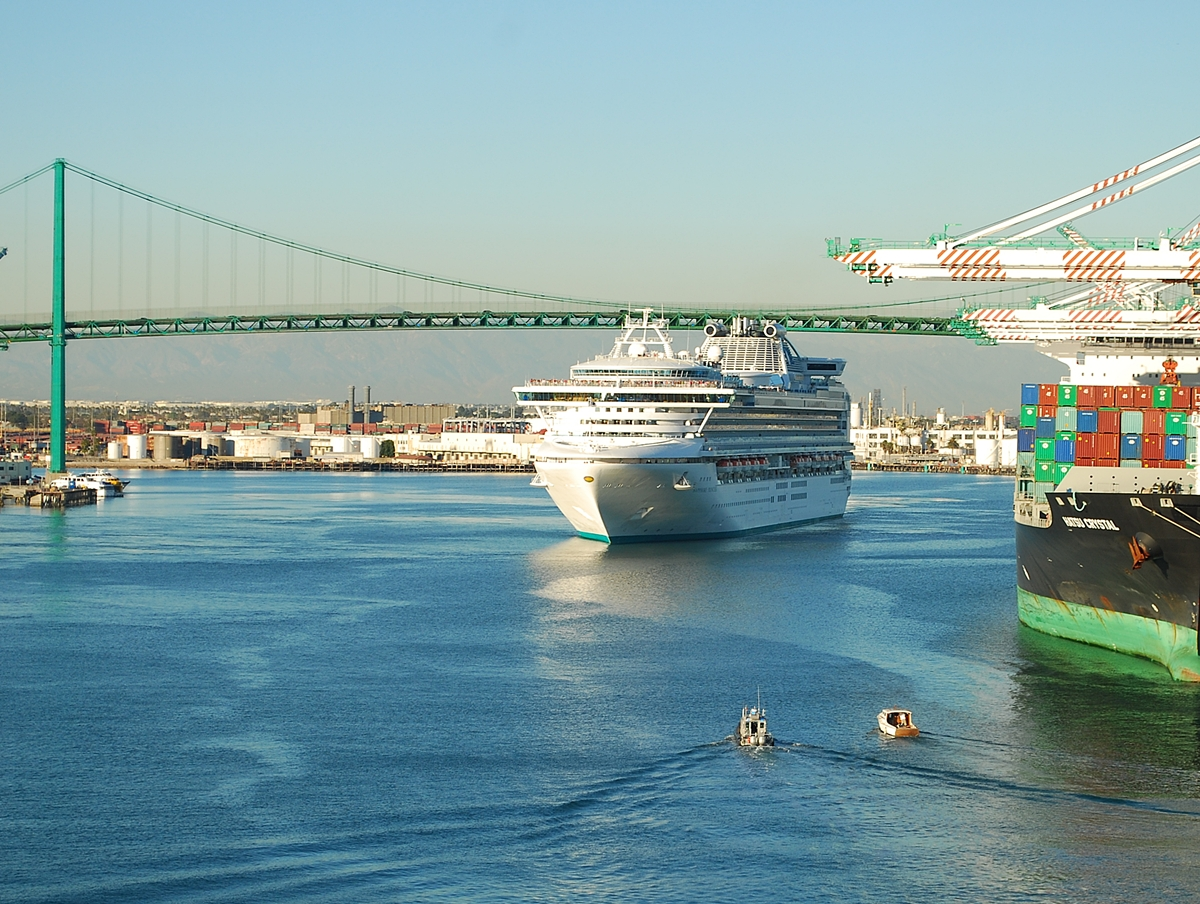
The cruise Ship Sapphire Princess passes under the Vincent Thomas Bridge as it departs Port of Los Angeles in 2011.

=== Films ===
The bridge has featured in numerous movies such as the original 1974 Gone in 60 Seconds and the 2000 Gone in 60 Seconds remake, Lethal Weapon 2, Lethal Weapon 4, To Live and Die in L.A., City of Angels, Charlie's Angels, and Den of Thieves.

In the 1995 film Heat, the bridge is mentioned by Robert De Niro's character when he points to the location and mistakenly refers to it as the "St. Vincent Thomas Bridge."

=== Television ===
The newly completed bridge, with safety netting still attached to the deck trusswork, is featured prominently in a warehouse fire scene in the CBS legal drama, Perry Mason, Season 7, Episode 22, "The Case of the Arrogant Arsonist", first aired on March 5, 1964.

The bridge's toll plaza is featured in a 1960s episode of the original series of Mission: Impossible where Mr. Phelps, played by Peter Graves, receives his instructions.

In the second-season episode of NBC's The Rockford Files, entitled "Gearjammers, Part 2", private investigator Jim Rockford, played by James Garner, drives over the bridge in his father's silver GMC Sierra Classic pickup, while being tailed by two thugs working for a big-rig hijacker.

The bridge was also featured extensively in season 1/episode 7 of NBC's crime series, CHiPs, airing November 3, 1977, titled, "Taking Its Toll." The old tollbooths were the center of the action, where bandits mugged drivers to steal contents from their cars.

The 1978 episode of NBC's Columbo entitled "The Conspirators" had a scene where Peter Falk's title character Lt. Columbo tries unsuccessfully to speed across the bridge in his 1959 Peugeot convertible.

In August 2012, for the season three premiere of the History Channel's show Top Gear, the bridge was used as a finishing line for a closed course race. The race was between professional driver Tanner Foust, who drove a 2009 Chevrolet Corvette Z06 police car, and professional stunt driver Ernie Vigil, who drove a Triumph 1050 Speed Triple motorcycle.

=== Video music ===
It was also the scene of the video "I Think I'm in Love with You" by Jessica Simpson.

=== Video games ===
The bridge was featured in the 2004 video game Grand Theft Auto: San Andreas as the Ocean Docks Bridge, and in the 2013 video game Grand Theft Auto V, where it is referred to as the Miriam Turner Overpass. The bridge is also featured in Need for Speed: Most Wanted as "Heflin Drive", in The Crew, and in Need for Speed as the South Port Bridge.

=== Suicides and stunt diving ===
Los Angeles police say a suicide attempt is made from the bridge "every few months". The most notable case includes that of film director Tony Scott who jumped off the bridge on August 19, 2012.

On October 26, 1990, 1964 Olympic diving bronze medalist Larry Andreasen was killed jumping from the west tower of the bridge in an attempt to set a diving record.

== Gallery ==
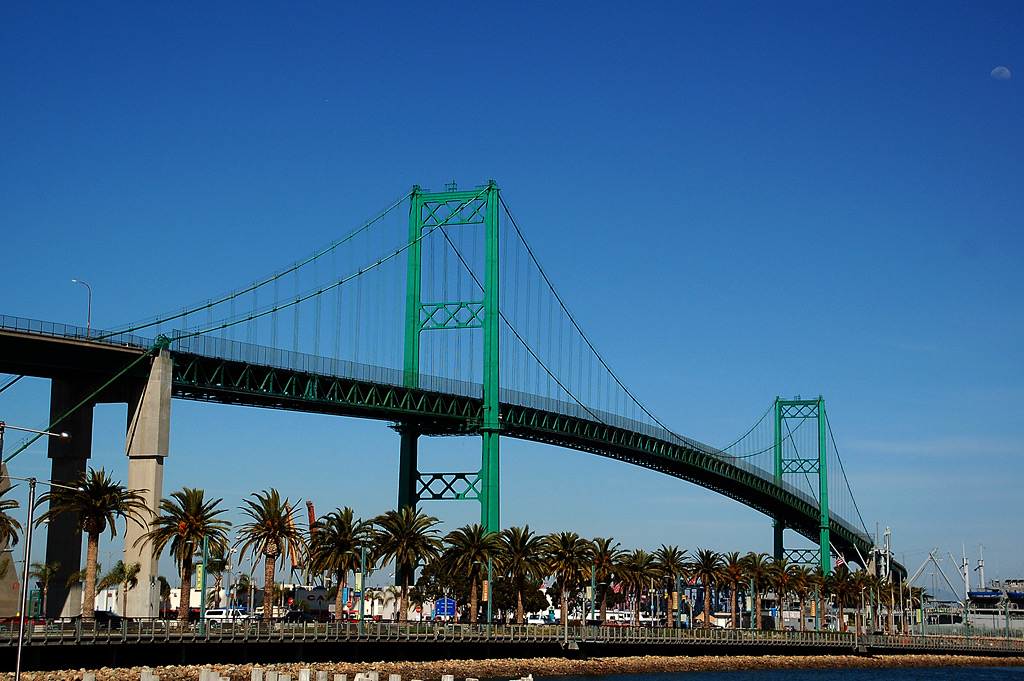
Vincent Thomas Bridge

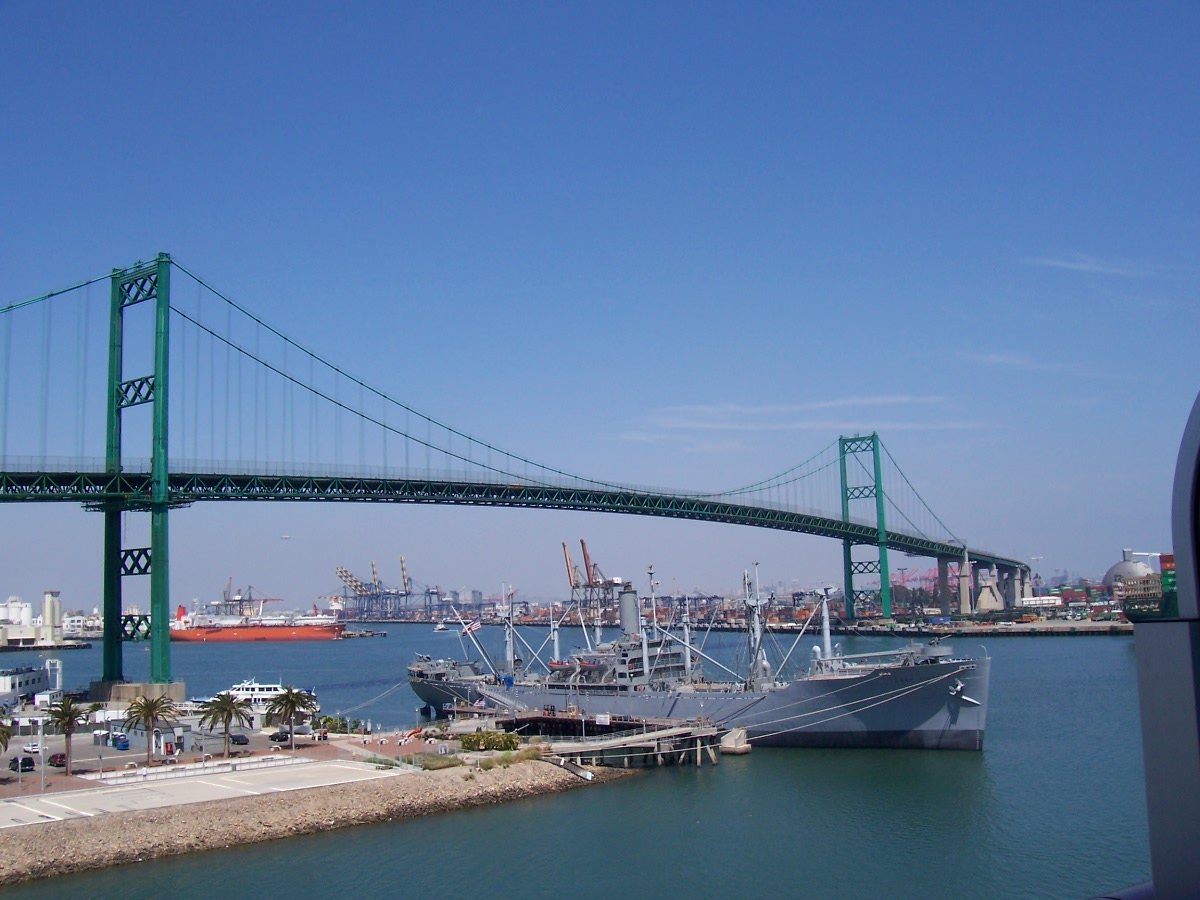
Vincent Thomas Bridge

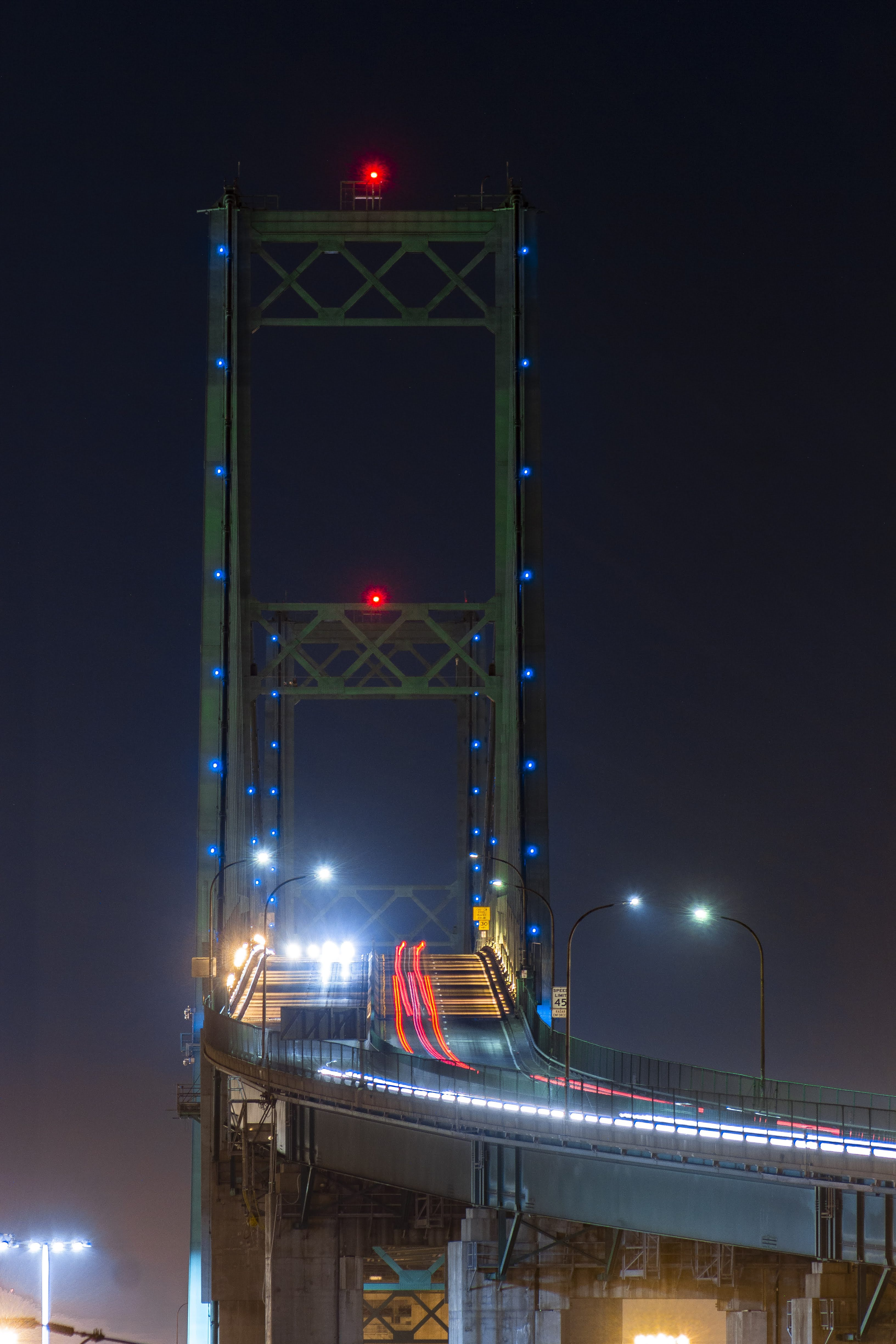
Nighttime view of the Vincent Thomas Bridge

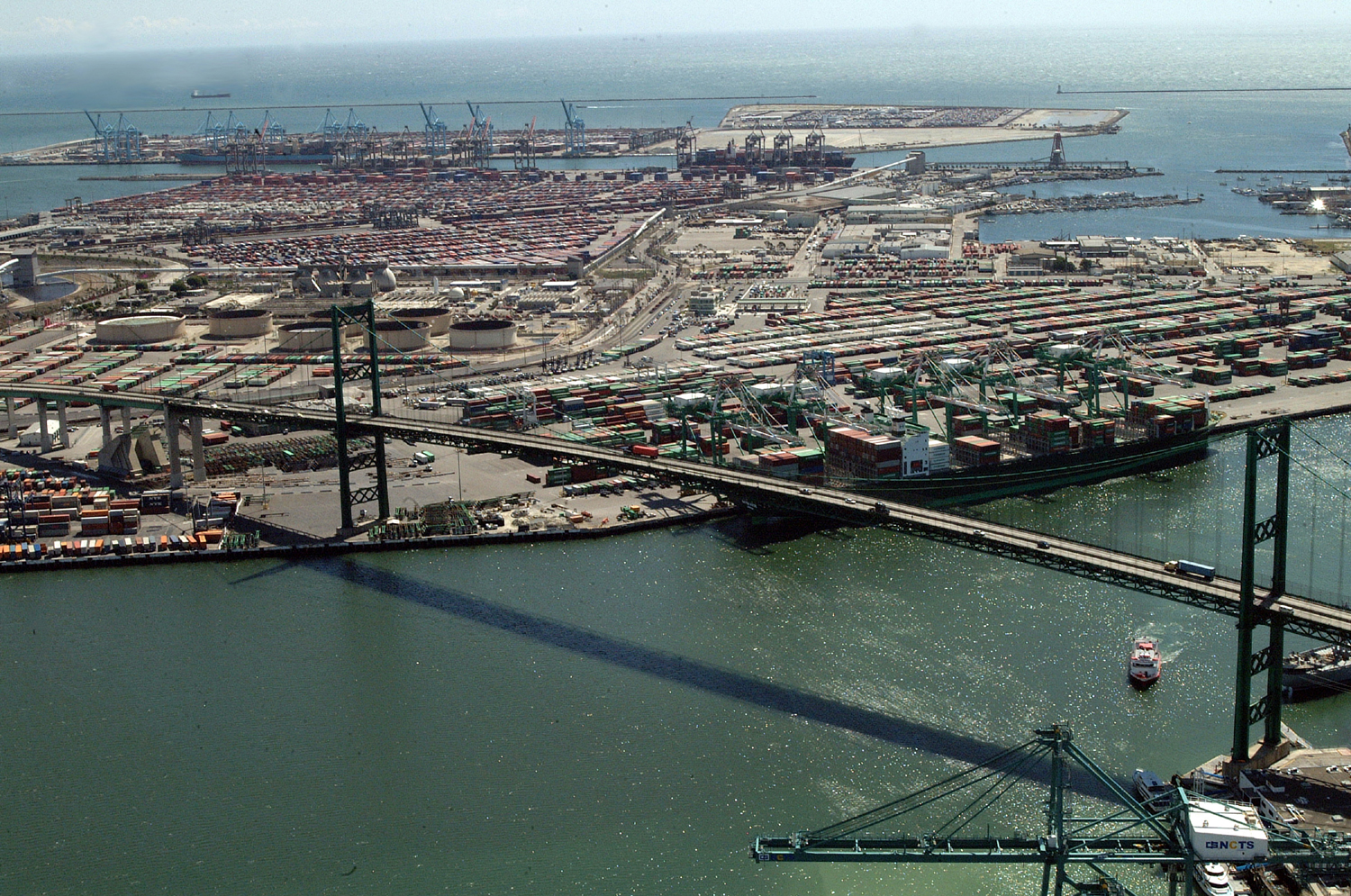
Vincent Thomas Bridge and the Port of Los Angeles

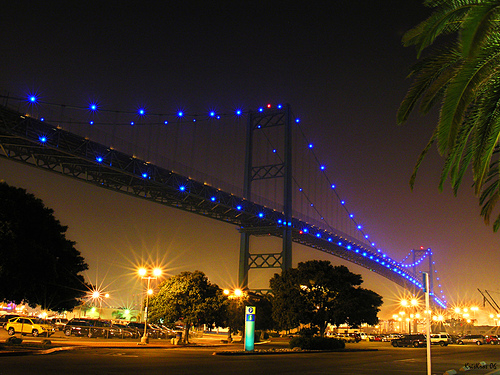
Vincent Thomas Bridge illuminated with blue LEDs

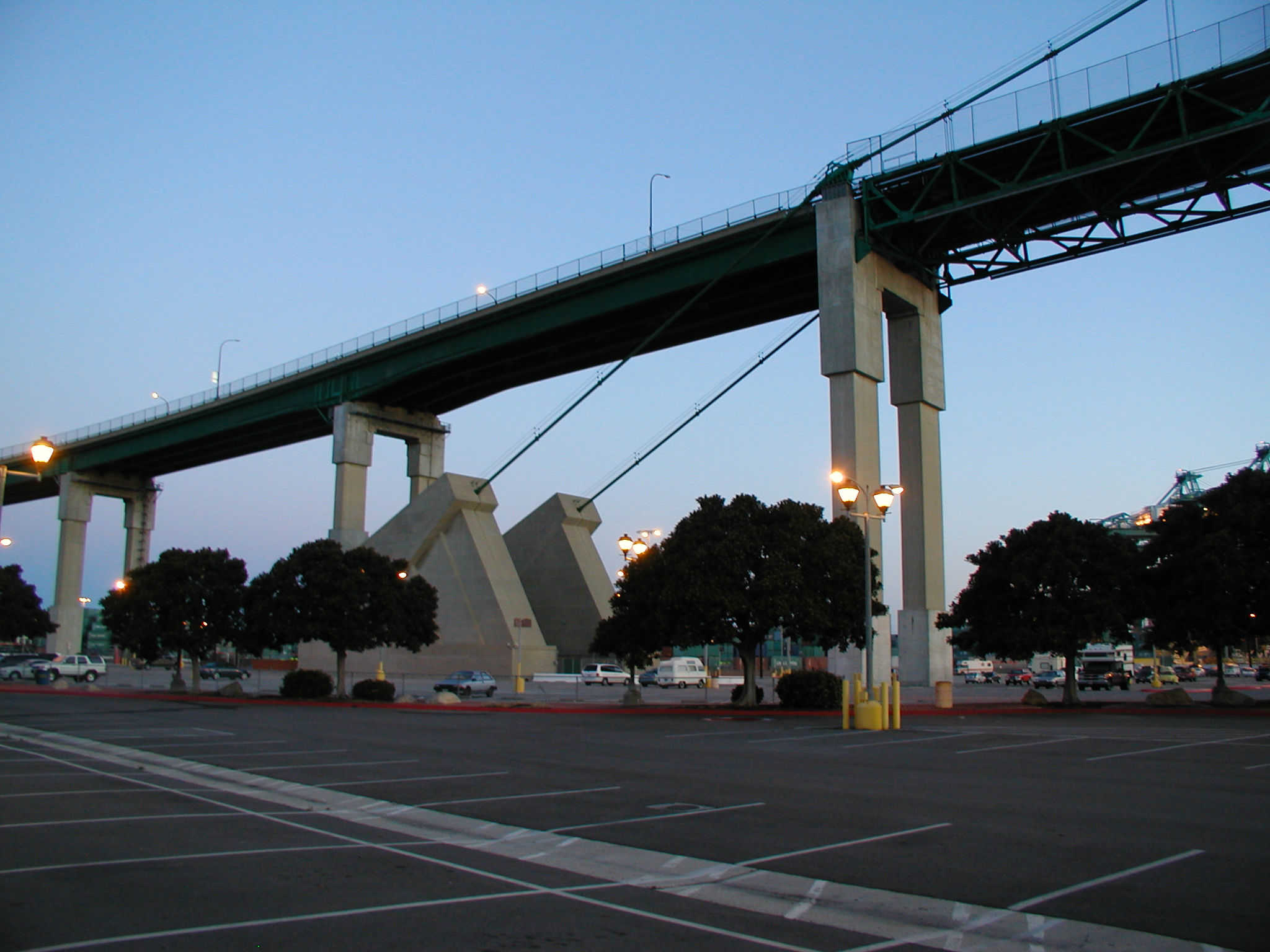
Vincent Thomas Bridge bridge suspension cable anchors

== See also ==
- Gerald Desmond Bridge
- Long Beach International Gateway
- Terminal Island
- Tacoma Narrows Bridge, a similar design with two towers in Washington
