= Movable scaffolding system =

Self-launching form used in bridge construction

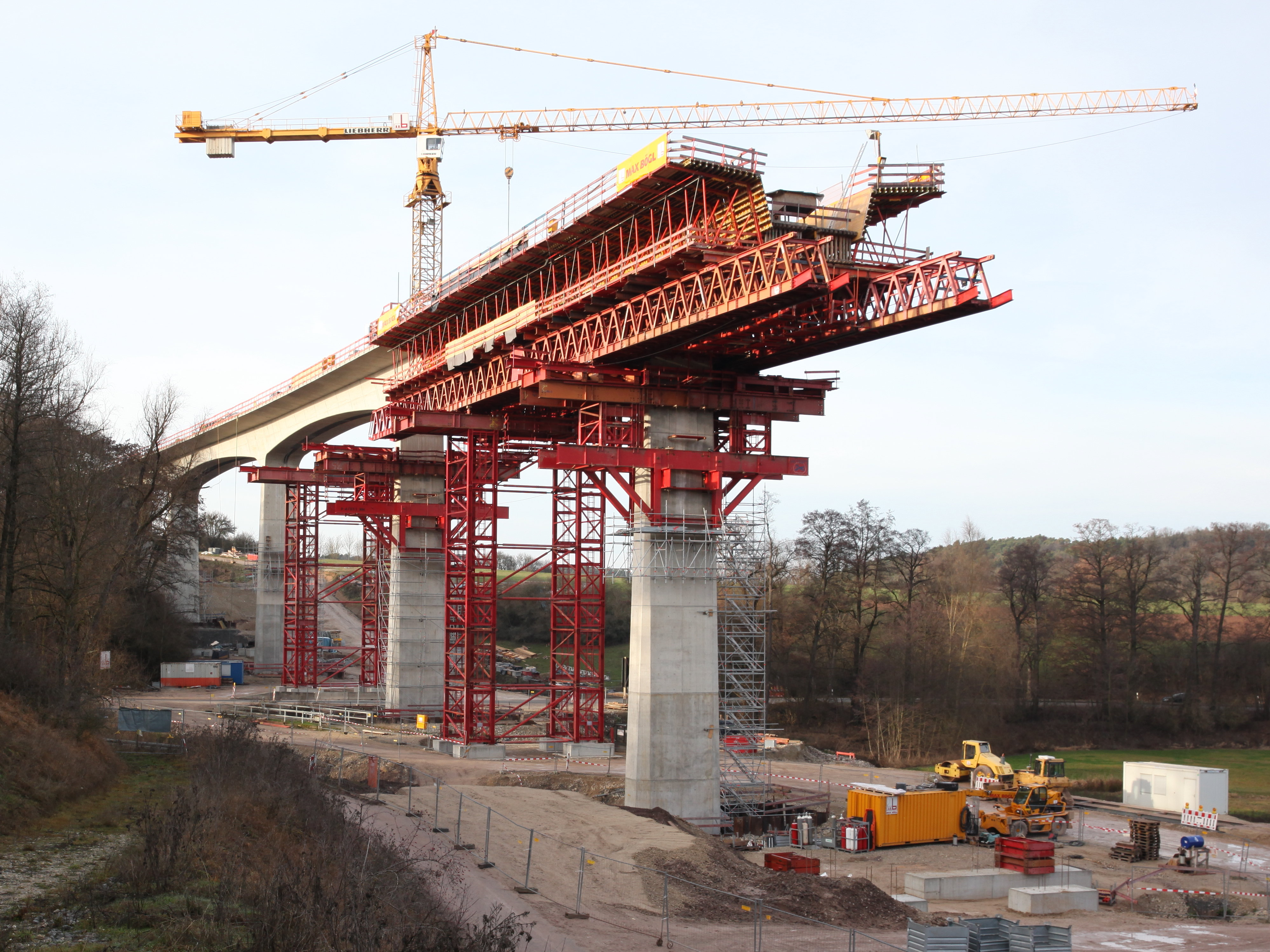
Underslung (lower-beam) movable scaffolding system used during construction of the Aurachtalbrücke Emskirchen (2015)

A movable scaffolding system (MSS) is a special-purpose self-launching form used in bridge construction, specifically prestressed concrete bridges with segments or spans that are cast in place. The movable scaffolding system is used to support a form while the concrete is cured; once the segment is complete, the scaffold and forms are moved to the end of the new segment and another segment is poured.

While superficially similar, movable scaffolding systems should not be confused with launching gantry machines, which also are used in segmental bridge construction. Both feature long girders spanning multiple bridge spans which move with and temporarily support the work, but launching gantry machines are used to lift and support precast bridge segments and bridge girders, while movable scaffolding systems are used for cast-in-place construction.

== Operation and design ==
An MSS is generally used instead of a launching gantry to minimize the number of joints, since the cast in place segments typically are longer than precast segments.

Once several bridge piers are complete, support brackets are attached to adjacent piers and the main parallel girders of the MSS are lifted in place to support the scaffold and concrete forms. Jacks are used to raise the girders and forms and the concrete is poured for the segment (or span) after rebar is placed. After the concrete has cured and the tendons have been tensioned, the jacks are lowered and the MSS girders are launched to bridge the next span. This process is repeated until the bridge is complete.

Both overhead (forms suspended from support girder(s) above the bridge deck level) and underslung (forms supported by support girder(s) below bridge deck level) MSS are available.

== History ==
MSS construction was developed in the 1960s in Europe; the first bridge built with a MSS was the Kettiger Hangbrücke in Germany, completed in 1959. The first bridge constructed with a MSS in California was the Long Beach International Gateway in Long Beach that replaced the Gerald Desmond Bridge, completed in 2020.

== See also ==
- Cast-in-place concrete
- Formwork
