= Back Channel, Port of Long Beach =

Canal in Long Beach, California

Coordinates: 33.7586463°N 118.226324°W

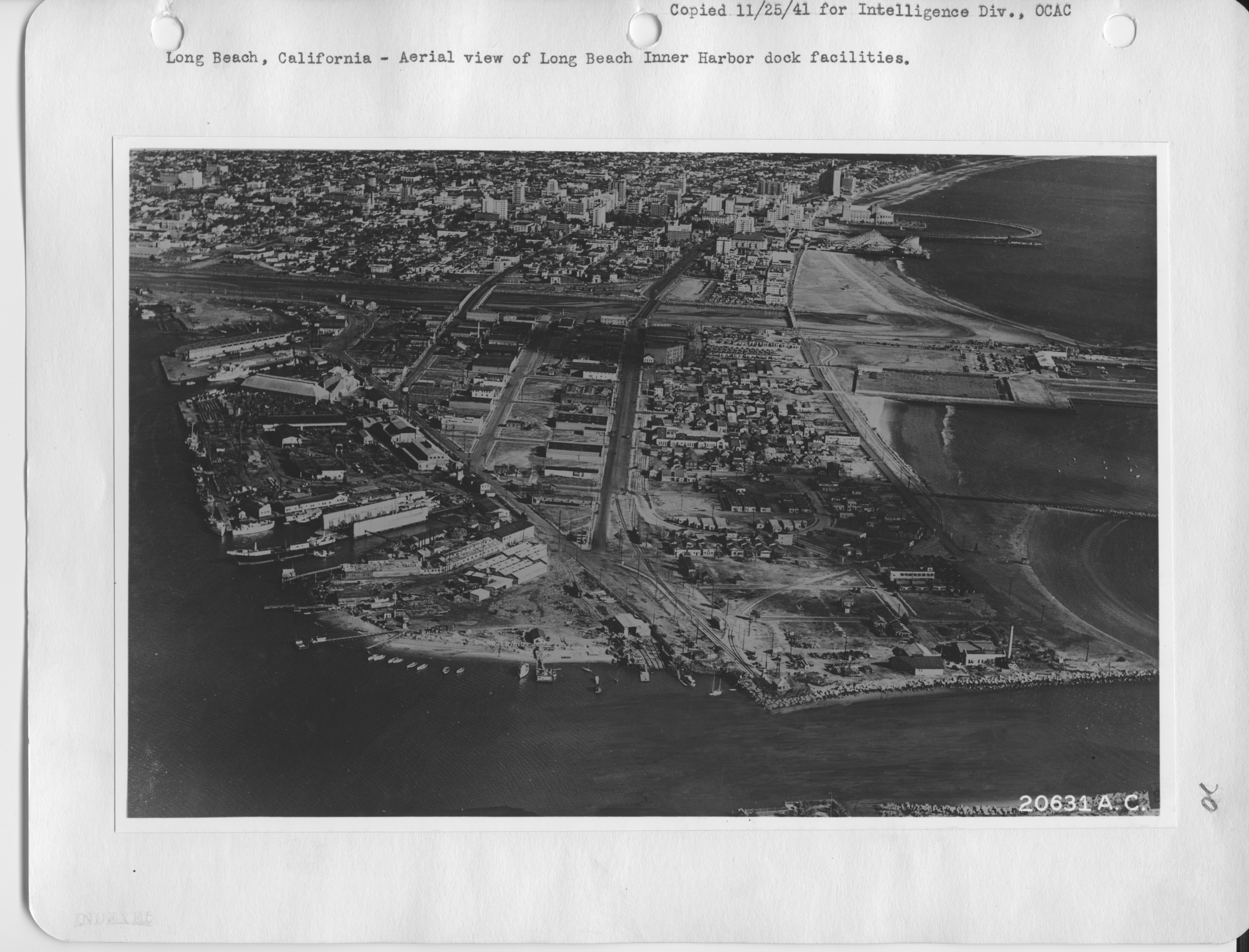
Back Channel (bottom) and the Los Angeles River (top), prior to the construction of the pontoon bridge

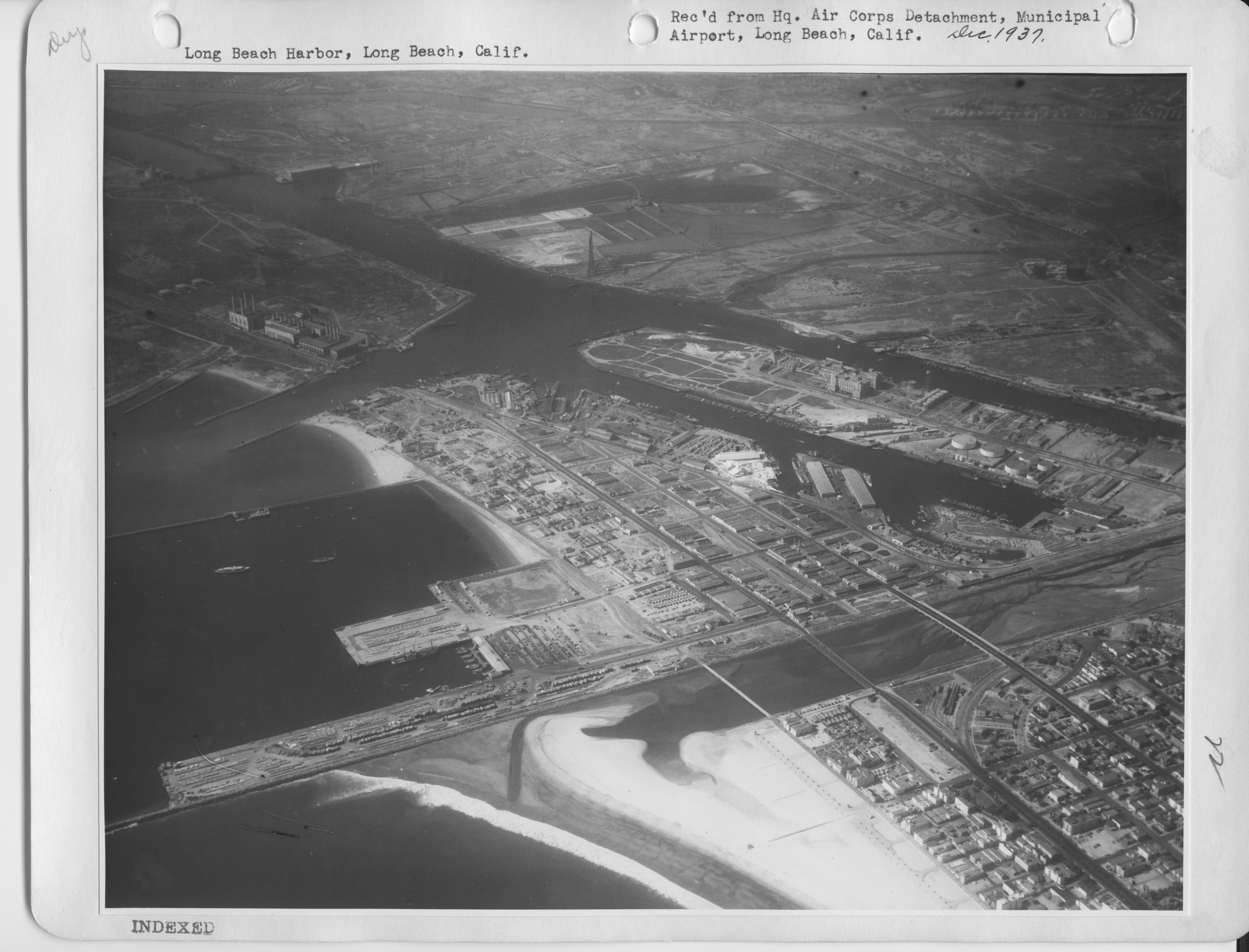
1937

Back Channel is a canal in the Port of Long Beach, California, United States, and is nearby to Terminal Island, Island Grissom, and Thenard. It is also close to the port's East Basin and the Gerald Desmond Bridge.

== See also ==
- Long Beach Naval Shipyard
