= Interstate 710 and California State Route 710 =

Interstate and state highway in California

Interstate 710 and State Route 710
- I-710 highlighted in red, SR 710 in purple

Route information
- Maintained by Caltrans
- Length: 23 mi (37 km)
- History: 1930s as highway, 1964 as a number (SR 7), 1983–1984 as an Interstate (I-710)
- Component highways: I-710 from Long Beach to Alhambra; SR 710 (unsigned) in Pasadena

Interstate 710
- South end: SR 47 / SR 103 in Long Beach
- Major intersections: SR 1 in Long Beach; I-405 in Long Beach; SR 91 in Long Beach; I-105 in Lynwood; I-5 in Commerce; SR 60 in East Los Angeles; I-10 in Monterey Park
- North end: Valley Boulevard at the Alhambra–Los Angeles line

State Route 710
- South end: Columbia Street in Pasadena
- North end: I-210 / SR 134 in Pasadena

Location
- Country: United States
- State: California
- County: Los Angeles

Highway system
- Interstate Highway System; Main; Auxiliary; Suffixed; Business; Future; State highways in California; Interstate; US; State; Scenic; History; Pre‑1964; Unconstructed; Deleted; Freeways
← I-680	→ I-780

Route 710, consisting of the non-contiguous segments of State Route 710 (SR 710) and Interstate 710 (I-710), is a major north–south state highway and auxiliary Interstate Highway in the Los Angeles metropolitan area of the U.S. state of California. Also called the Los Angeles River Freeway prior to November 18, 1954, the highway was initially planned to connect Long Beach and Pasadena, but a gap in the route exists from Alhambra to Pasadena through South Pasadena due to community opposition to its construction.

The completed southern segment is signed as I-710 (locally referred to as "the 710"), and is officially known as the Long Beach Freeway; and it runs north from Long Beach to Valley Boulevard, just north of I-10 (San Bernardino Freeway), near the boundary between the cities of Alhambra and Los Angeles. South of Atlantic Boulevard at the Bell–Vernon border, I-710 follows the course of the Los Angeles River, rarely wandering more than a few hundred feet from the riverbed. South of SR 1 in Long Beach, I-710 is officially part of the Seaside Freeway.

SR 710 is the designation of the completed portion of the proposed northern extension of the route to Pasadena. This segment runs from California Boulevard in Pasadena north to its northern terminus at SR 134 and I-210. It remains unsigned, except for onramps onto the stub which are signed as onramps onto I-210 instead of SR 710. Legislation passed in 2019 authorizes the state to relinquish control of the segment to the City of Pasadena on or after January 1, 2024.

Prior to 1983, the road was not an Interstate, although it was built to Interstate Highway standards. Until 1964 it was State Route 15, but it was renumbered to State Route 7 in the 1964 renumbering because of the existence of I-15, and to I-710 in 1983. However, the northern stub still contains postmile markers designating such stub as both Route 7 and Route 710.

== Route description ==
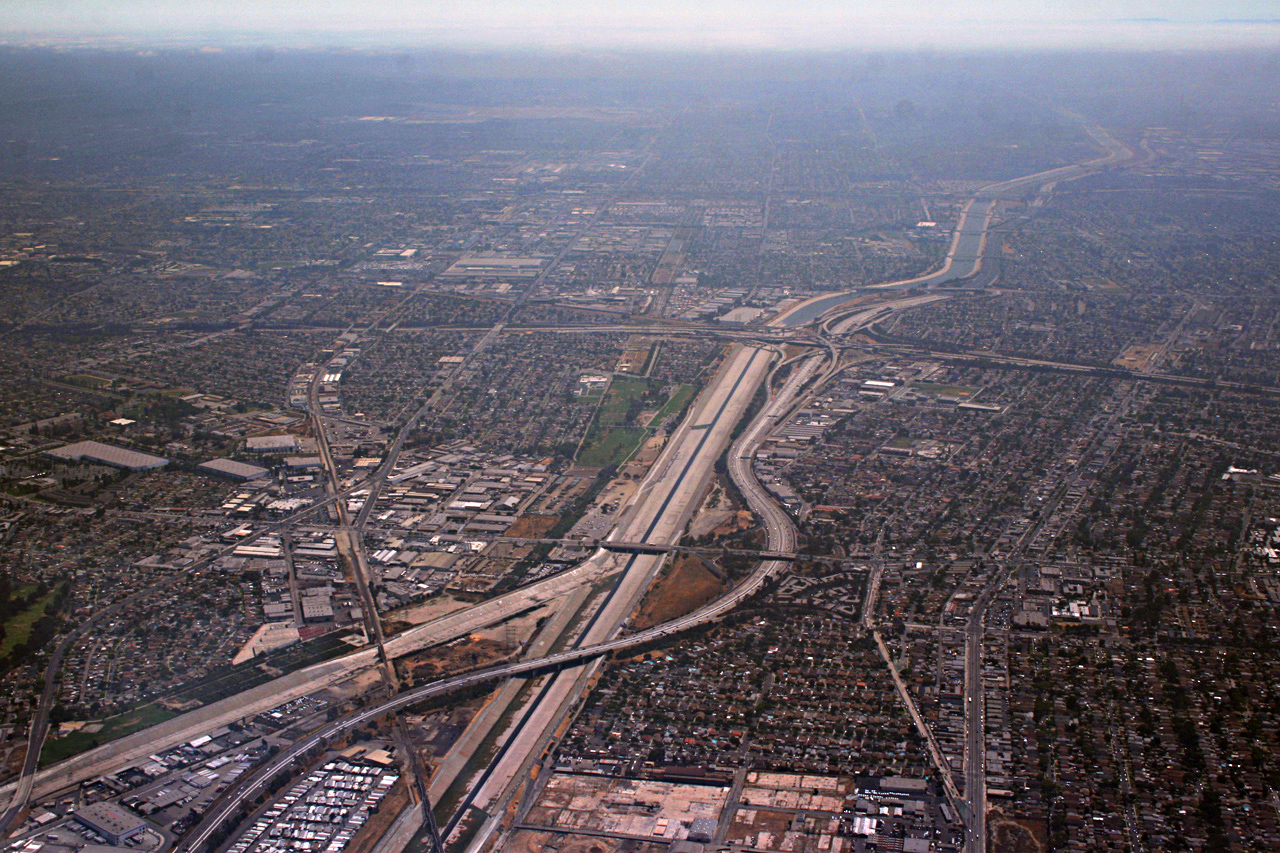
Aerial view of the I-105/I-710 interchange

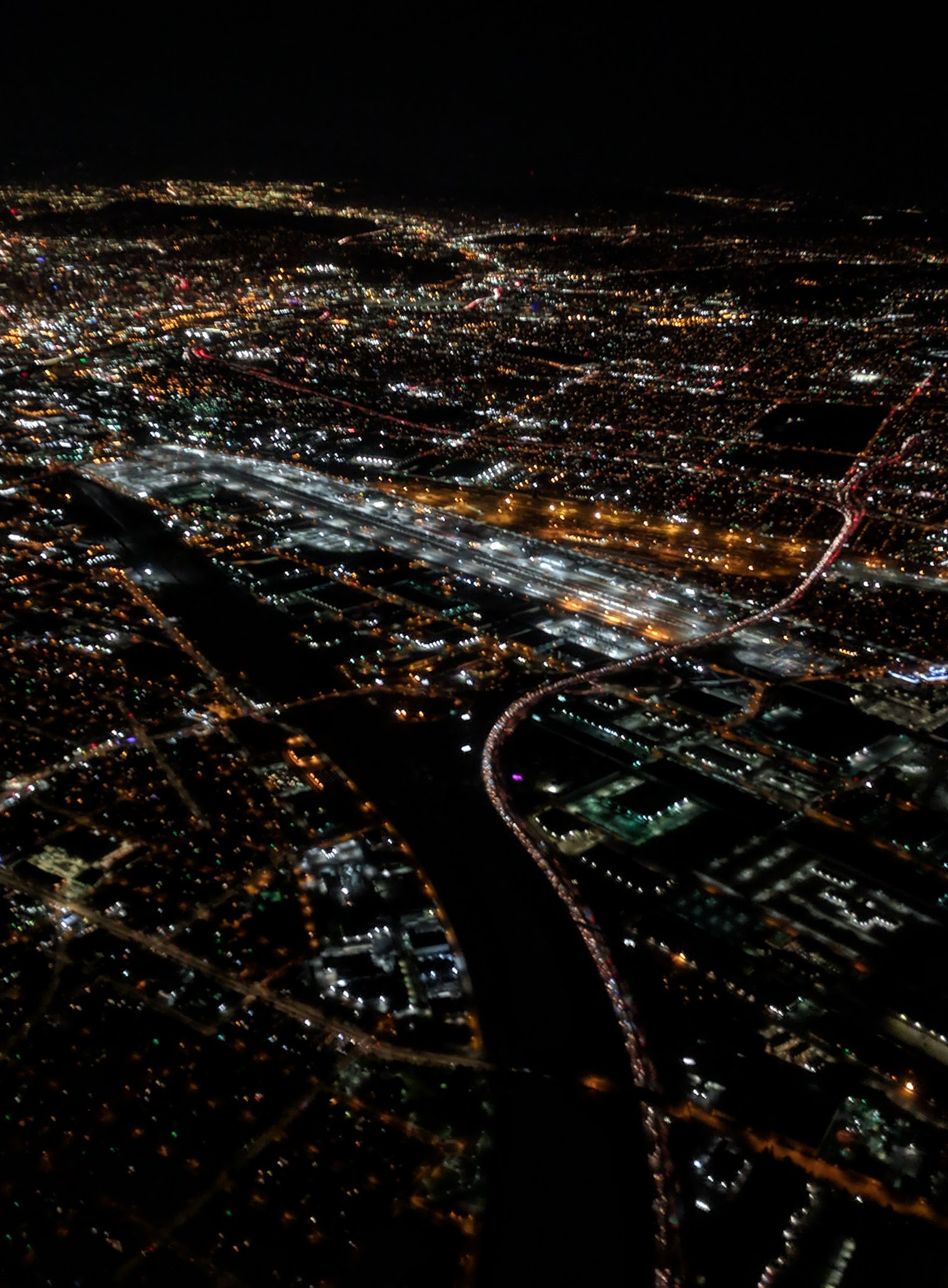
Night aerial view of the Los Angeles River where I-710 converges on it (from the right) at the City of Commerce

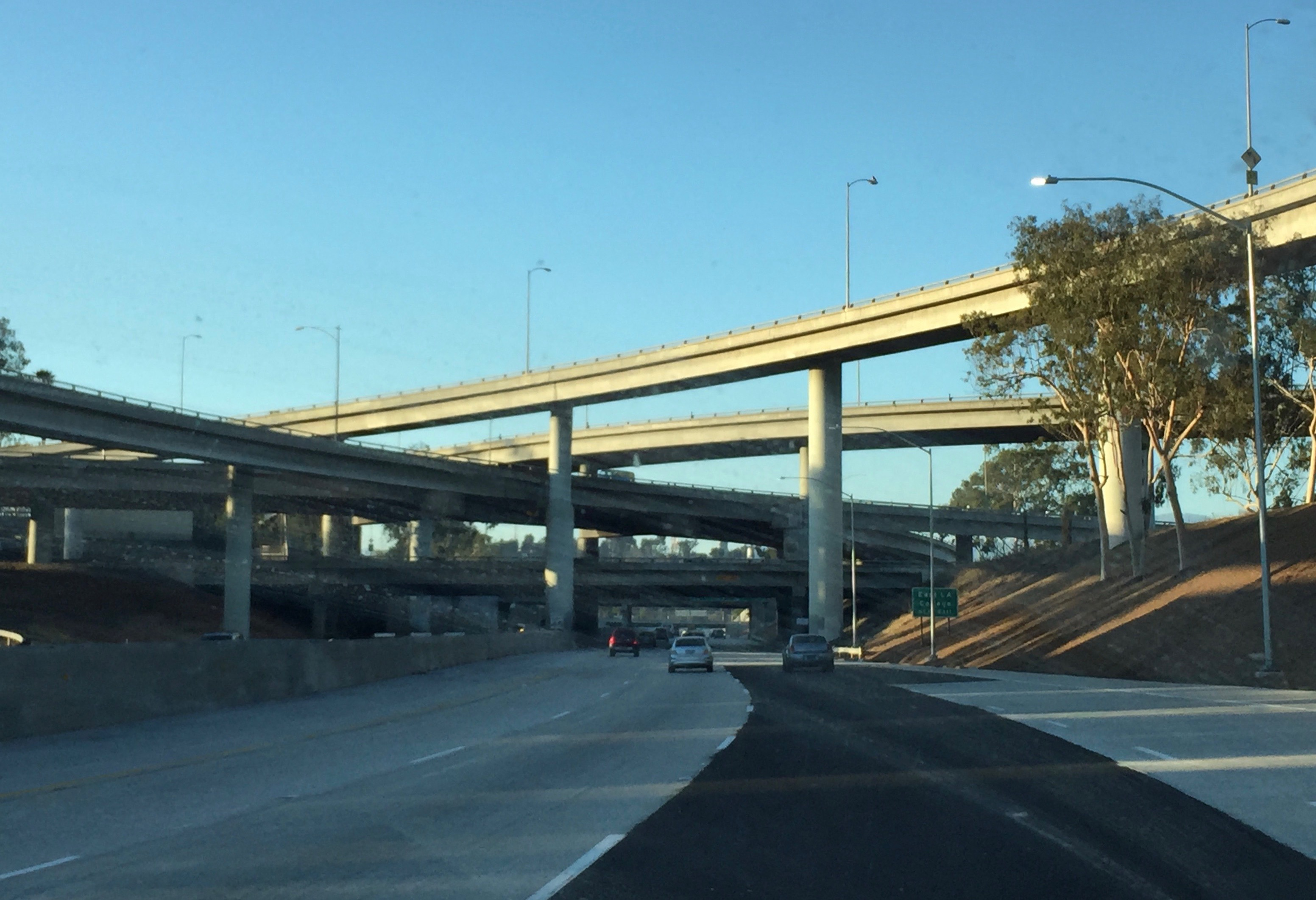
I-710 at its junction with SR 60 in East Los Angeles

Route 710 is defined as follows in sections 622 and 622.1 of the California Streets and Highways Code:

622. Route 710 is from Route 1 to Route 210 in Pasadena.

622.1. Route 710 shall also include that portion of the freeway between Route 1 and the northern end of Harbor Scenic Drive, that portion of Harbor Scenic Drive to Ocean Boulevard, that portion of Ocean Boulevard west of its intersection with Harbor Scenic Drive to its junction with Seaside Boulevard, and that portion of Seaside Boulevard from the junction with Ocean Boulevard to Route 47.

Only the segment of Route 710 between State Route 1 (SR 1) and I-10 is considered an Interstate Highway according to the Federal Highway Administration (FHWA)'s route logs.

However, the freeway is still signed as I-710 south of SR 1. I-710 separates into three spur freeways near its southern terminus. The first spur splits at the 9th Street interchange, with the left-branching ramps crossing the Shoemaker Bridge over Los Angeles River and becoming West Shoreline Drive as they head to downtown Long Beach, passing the Aquarium of the Pacific and the Long Beach Convention Center among other attractions. This spur becomes a surface arterial at the intersection with South Chestnut Place and the Pike Parking Garage. The second spur continues south as Harbor Scenic Drive, leading to the eastern piers of the Port of Long Beach and the Queen Mary. Meanwhile, the main segment continues south as the Seaside Freeway, keeping the I-710 designation, until the interchange with Ocean Boulevard, where offramps to Ocean Boulevard west carry both the Seaside Freeway name and I-710 designation across the Long Beach International Gateway Bridge. The I-710 designation then terminates at the interchange with SR 47, while the Seaside Freeway designation continues west along with SR 47 towards the Vincent Thomas Bridge.

Heading north of SR 1, the Long Beach Freeway follows the course of the Los Angeles River to Atlantic Boulevard at the Bell–Vernon city limits. I-710 then travels roughly north, east of downtown Los Angeles, to its current northern terminus at Valley Boulevard (just north of I-10) in Alhambra and the El Sereno neighborhood of Los Angeles.

There is a part of Route 710 in Pasadena that is constructed to freeway standards, extending from California Boulevard north to the Foothill (I-210)/Ventura (SR 134) freeway interchange. However, the route designation on this freeway stub is unsigned, and is instead marked as if it were merely freeway entrance and exit ramps to and from I-210.

I-710 and SR 710 are part of the California Freeway and Expressway System, and north of SR 1 are part of the National Highway System, a network of highways that are considered essential to the country's economy, defense, and mobility by the Federal Highway Administration. The official Long Beach Freeway designation is I-710 from SR 1 to I-5, as named by the California Highway Commission on November 18, 1954.

== History ==
State Route 15
- Location: Long Beach - Monterey Park
- Existed: 1934–1964

State Route 7
- Location: Long Beach - Monterey Park
- Existed: 1964–1985

=== 1930–1965 ===
Legislative Route 167 (LR 167) was defined in 1933 to run from San Pedro east to Long Beach and north to Monterey Park. An extension was added in 1947, taking it north to Pasadena. State Route 15 was signed in 1934 along the section of LR 167 from Pacific Coast Highway (SR 3, later U.S. Route 101 Alternate, now SR 1) in Long Beach north to Garvey Avenue (U.S. Route 99 (US 99), replaced by I-10) in Monterey Park. The original pre-freeway alignment ran along Los Robles Avenue (Pasadena) and Atlantic Boulevard. The freeway replacement of SR 15/LR 167 was built from 1953 to 1965. The whole route of LR 167, including the proposed extensions west to San Pedro and north to Pasadena, was renumbered State Route 7 in 1964, after it was decommissioned from portions of the San Diego Freeway (which is now I-405) as part of the state highway renumbering, as the number 15 conflicted with I-15 (Ironically, SR 15 still exists from I-8 to I-5 in San Diego). In 1965, the route was truncated to SR 1 in Long Beach; the part from SR 1 south and west to SR 47 was deleted, and the rest from SR 47 west to SR 11 (now I-110) became part of SR 47.

=== 1964–present ===
The Long Beach Freeway was approved as a non-chargeable Interstate in September 1983 by the FHWA, and on May 30, 1984, AASHTO approved the SR 7 designations to be renumbered to Interstate 710. In October 1984, the FHWA approved an additional 1.6-mile (2.6 km) extension from CA 1 to Ocean Boulevard. The short stub in Pasadena was built in 1975, along with the adjacent sections of I-210 and SR 134. There are still remaining overhead street signs pointing motorists to SR 7 on Ford Boulevard at its intersection with Floral Drive in Monterey Park. These are the last known signs to date.

The existing freeway from SR 1 south to Ocean Boulevard was taken over by the state on August 25, 2000, in a trade with the City of Long Beach for former SR 103 north of SR 1. In 2013, Caltrans adopted the remainder of the Seaside Freeway from Ocean Boulevard to SR 47 over the Gerald Desmond Bridge as part of Route 710. Caltrans and the Port of Long Beach completed the replacement for the old Gerald Desmond Bridge in October 2020; it was named the Long Beach International Gateway Bridge in May 2021.

== Future ==
=== I-710 corridor project ===
The significant growth of cargo volumes handled at the ports of Los Angeles and Long Beach has added a large amount of truck traffic to the Long Beach Freeway, since it is the most direct route between the port complex and the railyards in Vernon and East Los Angeles, as well as the Pomona and San Bernardino freeways that connect Los Angeles to railyards in San Bernardino and Colton. The freeway's pavement has been badly damaged as a result since it was not designed to carry nearly as large of a load of truck traffic. It has also become a major source of air pollution, emanating from diesel-fueled trucks idling in rush-hour traffic congestion and giving cities along its route some of the worst air quality in already smoggy Southern California. In response, as of 2011 an Environmental Impact Statement/Environmental Impact Report is being conducted to analyze possible significant improvements to I-710 between the Ports of Long Beach and Los Angeles and the Pomona Freeway (SR 60).

In March 2018, Caltrans considered plans to expand I-710, which would have entailed adding lanes for trucks and demolishing homes. However, this would have exacerbated the problem of air pollution around the freeway, by enabling more diesel-power trucks to travel on it. The area around the freeway is already described as a "diesel death zone" due to the pollution. These plans were indefinitely shelved due to public opposition.

Another potential solution to the problem is shifting freight to the Alameda Corridor. This is a freight railroad that runs parallel to I-710. Right now, 33% of freight moving to and from the Port of L.A. goes by rail.

=== The South Pasadena gap ===
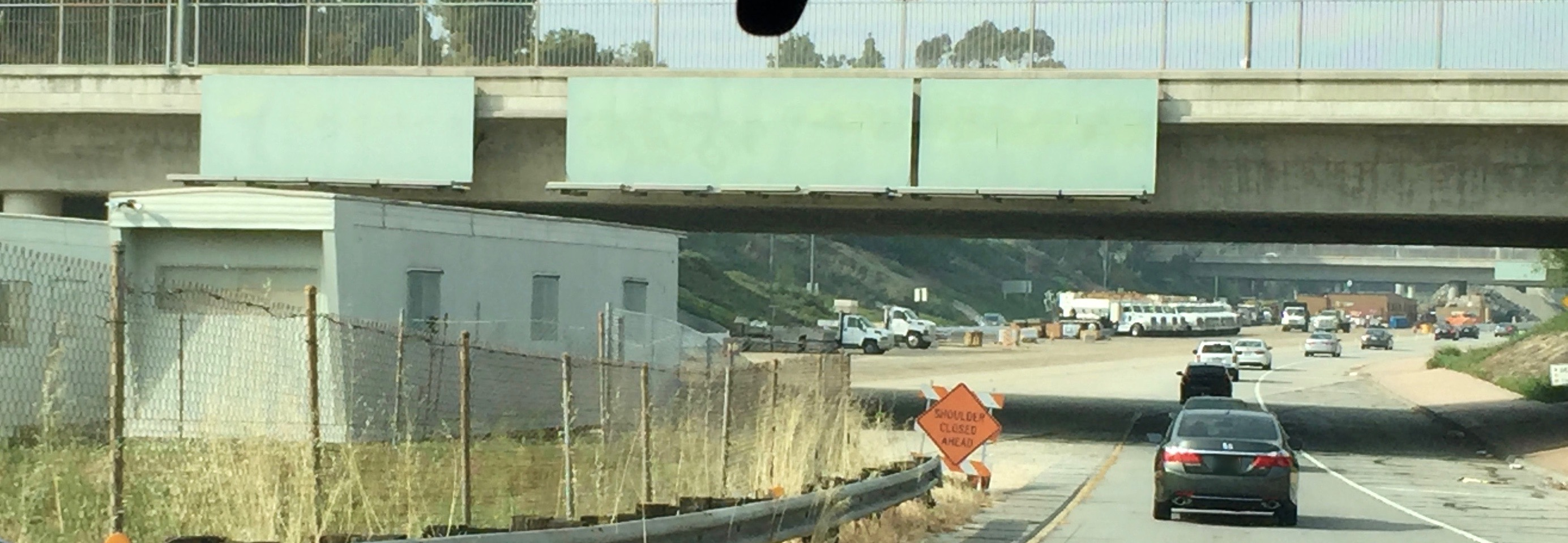
Southern onramp, I-710 northern stub, near downtown Pasadena. Note dormant construction equipment lining the median, and the road sign structures installed on the overpass without any signs posted.

==== Overview ====
The planned segment from Alhambra to Pasadena through South Pasadena has been subject to legal battles which have stopped construction. Because of these legal disputes, the freeway's northern terminus has been Valley Boulevard since the 1960s. However, a short unsigned freeway does exist in Pasadena, heading south from the interchange of I-210 and SR 134 to California Boulevard.

As a result of the route's incomplete condition, freeway signs are inconsistent in their identification of I-710's northbound destination, with some indicating Pasadena as a control city and others identifying Valley Boulevard as the freeway's terminus. For example, approaching I-710 from SR 60 (Pomona Freeway) in East Los Angeles, westbound traffic is given Valley Boulevard as the destination for northbound I-710, while eastbound traffic is given a destination of Pasadena. Signs at the interchange with I-105, SR 91, and I-405 show Pasadena as the destination for northbound I-710.

Currently, traffic headed for Pasadena on I-710 is redirected to I-10 (San Bernardino Freeway) eastbound by signs at the interchange between the two routes in Monterey Park. These signs identify both Pasadena and San Bernardino as control cities for the eastbound San Bernardino Freeway, although it does not actually pass through Pasadena. Rather, traffic to the city is directed to take SR 19 (Rosemead Boulevard) northbound from its junction with I-10 (about 6 miles (9.7 km) east of I-710) to reach Pasadena. Traffic from northbound I-710 is routed onto Fremont Avenue in Alhambra and South Pasadena, and the Pasadena Freeway (SR 110).

The areas around I-710, northeastern Los Angeles and the northwestern San Gabriel Valley are subject to traffic congestion. There are no completed north–south freeways in the 12-mile (19 km) area between I-5 (Golden State Freeway) and I-605 (San Gabriel River Freeway). Pro– and anti–I-710 lobbies have debated whether finishing I-710 would alleviate any of the San Gabriel Valley's traffic congestion, or merely displace it from surface streets to the freeway.

==== 2009–2012 corridor studies ====
Caltrans and its local partner, the Los Angeles County Metropolitan Transportation Authority (Metro), researched the possibility of extending the freeway from Valley Boulevard to Pasadena by building a bored tunnel under Alhambra, El Sereno, and South Pasadena. The premise was that a tunnel would allow Caltrans to extend the freeway without disturbing the residential neighborhoods on the surface, similar to other tunnels throughout the world. The proposed twin 4.5-mile-long (7.2 km) tunnels would have been the longest in the United States, but were small compared with others around the world. Between January and May 2009, Caltrans conducted soil samples for the tunneling project in the Pasadena area and completed a combined environmental impact statement (EIS) and environmental impact report (EIR), in which the tunnel was one option.

In August 2012, Metro narrowed down the list of potential alternatives to study in the EIR/EIS process. The alternatives included: (1) a no-build alternative, where no additional infrastructure would be built to address the gap in the freeway plan between Valley Boulevard and I-210; (2) a roadway tunnel without exits to connect the northern terminus of the freeway at Valley Boulevard to Pasadena; (3) a light rail line connecting East L.A. with Pasadena using a route that travels along the I-710 right of way until Valley Boulevard where it would become a subway until connecting with the Metro Gold Line at the Fillmore Metro station in Pasadena; (4) a bus rapid transit line from Montebello to Pasadena; and (5) Transportation System Management/Transportation Demand Management (TSM/TDM).

==== Termination ====
In February 2017, California Assemblyman Chris Holden (D-Pasadena) sponsored a bill to block the completion of the I-710/I-210 gap by tunnel or other means, and his position was supported by South Pasadena and Pasadena. This unanimously led to a decision by the Los Angeles Metro authorities in May to completely defund the completion of the I-710 freeway gap between the northernmost terminus at Valley Blvd in Alhambra, to the I-210 interchange in Pasadena.

The $780 million allocated through Measure R for the intended project of closing of the gap will now be allocated to improvement of certain local surface street projects, improved traffic signal synchronizations, and other "mobility improvement projects". Holden, along with State Senator Anthony Portantino introduced similar legislation, Assembly Bill 29 and Senate Bill 7 respectively, to officially delete this segment of Route 710 from the highway grid. Signed by governor Gavin Newsom in October 2019, they will take effect on January 1, 2024. Among others, the new laws authorize the maintenance of the existing portion of Route 710 between California Boulevard and the I-210/SR 134 interchange to be transferred to the City of Pasadena, and remove that segment from the California Freeway and Expressway System.

== Exit list ==
Except where prefixed with a letter, postmiles were measured on the road as it was in 1964, based on the alignment that existed at the time, and do not necessarily reflect current mileage. Postmile prefixes include: R reflecting a realignment in the route since then, M indicating a second realignment, L referring to an overlap due to a correction or change, and T indicating postmiles classified as temporary. Segments that remain unconstructed or have been relinquished to local control may be omitted. The entire route is in Los Angeles County.

Location	Postmile	Exit	Destinations	Notes
Long Beach			SR 47 south – San Pedro	South end of I-710
Long Beach			SR 47 north / SR 103 north – Piers A S-T	South end of SR 103
Long Beach			Pier T Avenue – Piers S T	Northbound entrance only; southbound exit is via the SR 47 north exit with access provided through a Texas U-turn
Long Beach		Long Beach International Gateway Bridge		
Long Beach			Pico Avenue, Downtown Long Beach, Piers A-J	Northbound exit and southbound entrance
Long Beach	4.96		Port of Long Beach, Piers A-J	Northbound exit and southbound entrance
Long Beach	5.46	1A	Queen Mary (Harbor Scenic Drive) – Piers F-J	Southbound exit and northbound entrance
Long Beach	5.98	1B	Pico Avenue – Piers B-E	Southbound exit and northbound entrance
Long Beach	6.06	1C	Downtown Long Beach, Aquarium (Long Beach Freeway, Shoreline Drive)	Southbound left exit and northbound entrance
Long Beach	6.38	1D	Anaheim Street	Signed as exit 1 northbound
Long Beach	6.88	2	SR 1 (Pacific Coast Highway) – Huntington Beach, Santa Monica	Former US 101 Alternate / US 6
Long Beach	7.89	3	Willow Street	Signed as exits 3A (east) and 3B (west)
Long Beach	9.07	4	Wardlow Road	Southbound exit and northbound entrance
Long Beach	9.41	4	I-405 (San Diego Freeway) – San Diego, Santa Monica	Former SR 7; I-405 north exits 32A-B; south exits 32B-C
Long Beach	10.82	6	Del Amo Boulevard	Signed as exits 6A (east) and 6B (west) northbound
Long Beach	12.01	7	Long Beach Boulevard	Signed as exits 7A (south) and 7B (north) southbound
Long Beach	12.89	8A	Artesia Boulevard	Northbound exit and southbound entrance; exit is part of SR 91
Long Beach	12.97	8A	SR 91 east (Artesia Freeway) – Riverside	Signed as the opposite southbound; SR 91 east exits 12A-B, west exit 12A
Long Beach	12.97	8B	SR 91 west (Gardena Freeway) – Redondo Beach	Signed as the opposite southbound; SR 91 east exits 12A-B, west exit 12A
Compton	13.95	9	Alondra Boulevard	Signed as exits 9A (east) and 9B (west) southbound
Paramount	R14.98	10	Rosecrans Avenue	
Lynwood	R15.69	11A	I-105 east (Century Freeway) – Norwalk	Signed as exit 11A southbound; I-105 exit 13
Lynwood	R15.69	11B	I-105 west (Century Freeway) – El Segundo	Signed as exit 11A southbound; I-105 exit 13
Lynwood		11B	Martin Luther King Jr. Boulevard	Southbound exit and entrance; formerly Century Boulevard
South Gate	16.99	12	Imperial Highway – Lynwood	Signed as exits 12A (east) and 12B (west) southbound; Former SR 90
South Gate	18.44	13	Firestone Boulevard	Former SR 42
Bell	19.73	15	Florence Avenue	
Bell–Vernon line	21.92	17A	Atlantic Boulevard, Bandini Boulevard	Signed as exits 17A (north/east) and 17B (south/west) northbound
Commerce	22.45	17B	Washington Boulevard	Signed as exit 17C northbound
Commerce	23.28	18A	I-5 north (Santa Ana Freeway) – Los Angeles	Northbound left exit and southbound entrance; I-5 south exit 130B
Commerce	23.28	18	I-5 south (Santa Ana Freeway) – Santa Ana	Southbound left exit and northbound entrance; I-5 north exit 130C
East Los Angeles	23.77	19	Whittier Boulevard, Olympic Boulevard	Signed as exit 18B northbound; Whittier Boulevard is former US 101 / SR 72
East Los Angeles	24.47	20A	3rd Street	Signed as exit 20B northbound
East Los Angeles	24.63	20B	SR 60 (Pomona Freeway) – Pomona, Los Angeles	Signed as exit 20A northbound; SR 60 exit 3B
East Los Angeles	24.97	20C	Cesar Chavez Avenue	Formerly Brooklyn Avenue
Monterey Park	26.38	21	Ramona Boulevard	Northbound exit and southbound entrance; former US 99
Monterey Park–Alhambra line	26.50	22A	I-10 west (San Bernardino Freeway) – Los Angeles	Signed as exit 22 northbound; I-10 exit 21
Monterey Park–Alhambra line	26.50	22B	I-10 east (San Bernardino Freeway) – San Bernardino	Signed as exit 22 northbound; I-10 exit 21
Monterey Park–Alhambra line	26.50	—	El Monte Busway (SR 10S west)	Buses only; southbound exit and northbound entrance
Alhambra–Los Angeles line	T27.48	23	Valley Boulevard	At-grade intersection; former US 60; north end of I-710
Gap in route
Pasadena	T30.95		Columbia Street to SR 110 south	At-grade intersection; south end of unsigned SR 710
Pasadena	T31.76		California Boulevard to SR 110	At-grade intersection
Pasadena		South end of freeway		
Pasadena	T32.11		Del Mar Boulevard	Southbound exit and northbound entrance
Pasadena	T32.45		Colorado Boulevard – Pasadena	Southbound exit and northbound entrance; former US 66 Alt. / SR 11
Pasadena	R32.72		SR 134 west (Ventura Freeway) – Ventura	SR 134 exit 13B; northbound exit and southbound entrance
Pasadena	R32.72		I-210 (Foothill Freeway) – San Fernando, San Bernardino	I-210 east exit 25A; northbound exit and southbound entrance; north end of unsigned SR 710
1.000 mi = 1.609 km; 1.000 km = 0.621 mi: Concurrency terminus; Incomplete access

=== South Harbor Scenic Drive spur (exit 1A) ===
The entire route is in Long Beach, Los Angeles County.

mi	km	Destinations	Notes
		Queen Mary	Southbound exit and northbound entrance
		Harbor Scenic Drive, Harbor Plaza – Piers H-J	Southbound exit and northbound entrance
		Harbor Plaza – Port of Long Beach, Piers F-G	Southbound exit only
		Downtown Long Beach (Queensway Bridge)	Northbound exit and entrance
		Queensway Drive	Northbound exit and entrance
		Pico Avenue – Piers F-G	No northbound exit
		Downtown Long Beach (Ocean Boulevard)	Northbound exit only
		I-710 north (N. Harbor Scenic Drive) – Pasadena	Northbound exit and southbound entrance
1.000 mi = 1.609 km; 1.000 km = 0.621 mi

=== Shoreline Drive spur (exit 1C) ===
The entire route is in Long Beach, Los Angeles County.

mi	km	Destinations	Notes
		Pine Avenue (Shoreline Drive) – Convention Center, Shoreline Village	Continuation beyond Queensway Bridge
		Queen Mary, Events Park, Cruise Ships (Queensway Bridge)	At-grade intersection
		Golden Shore, Catalina Landing	Southbound exit and entrance
		Ocean Boulevard	Northbound exit and entrance
		Shoreline Drive	Northbound U-turn
		Pine Avenue, Broadway – Long Beach Civic Center	Southbound exit and northbound entrance
		6th Street east – Downtown Long Beach	Southbound exit and northbound entrance
		9th Street, Anaheim Street – Port of Long Beach	Closed in May 2026 to make way for Pier B Project at Port of Long Beach; was northbound exit and southbound entrance
		I-710 north (Long Beach Freeway) – Pasadena	Northbound exit and southbound entrance
1.000 mi = 1.609 km; 1.000 km = 0.621 mi: Closed/former; Incomplete access
