= Gerald Desmond =

American politician

Gerald Desmond (April 12, 1915 – January 31, 1964 (aged 48)) was a prominent Democratic politician and civic leader in Long Beach, California who served as a Long Beach City Councilmember and as Long Beach City Attorney.

Desmond was born in Long Beach, California on April 12, 1915. He was the second oldest son of Walter Desmond (1876–1951), a religious Irish Catholic lawyer from Boston who came to California in 1905 and opened a law office in Long Beach. Walter Desmond was later appointed a Superior Court Judge and was one of the first judges to assign weekend jail time so offenders could work during the week.

Desmond graduated from Long Beach Polytechnic High School. In 1932, he met his future wife, Virginia Slater, at Long Beach City College. He briefly attended California State University, Long Beach, but soon transferred to Cal Berkeley. After graduation, along with Virginia, he attended law school at his father's alma mater, Harvard. In 1937 he and Virginia were married, and eventually had five children.

When World War II began in 1941, Desmond worked in the U.S. Attorney's Office. As a result, he would not have had to go into the service, but he was eager to join and enlisted in the U.S. Navy. He was in the supply corps, and then he was transferred to fraud investigation. The Navy sent him to Harvard Business School to train him to prepare for disposing of surplus disposal after the war, but never worked in this field. While he was investigating fraud, he traveled a lot. The Desmonds rented a house in Long Beach and Gerald went to New York, where he was stationed. He never went overseas. After the war, he came back to Long Beach and opened a private law practice.

Desmond became active in local government and served on the City Council. He was a delegate to the 1960 Democratic National Convention in Los Angeles. Later in 1960, he was elected City Attorney and served in that position until his death in 1964 at the age of 48.

The Gerald Desmond Bridge, which opened in 1968 and connected Terminal Island and Long Beach, was named in his honor. The bridge was replaced with the Long Beach International Gateway Bridge. Demolition of the Gerald Desmond Bridge began in 2022.
