= Long Beach International Gateway =

Cable-stayed bridge in Long Beach, California, United States

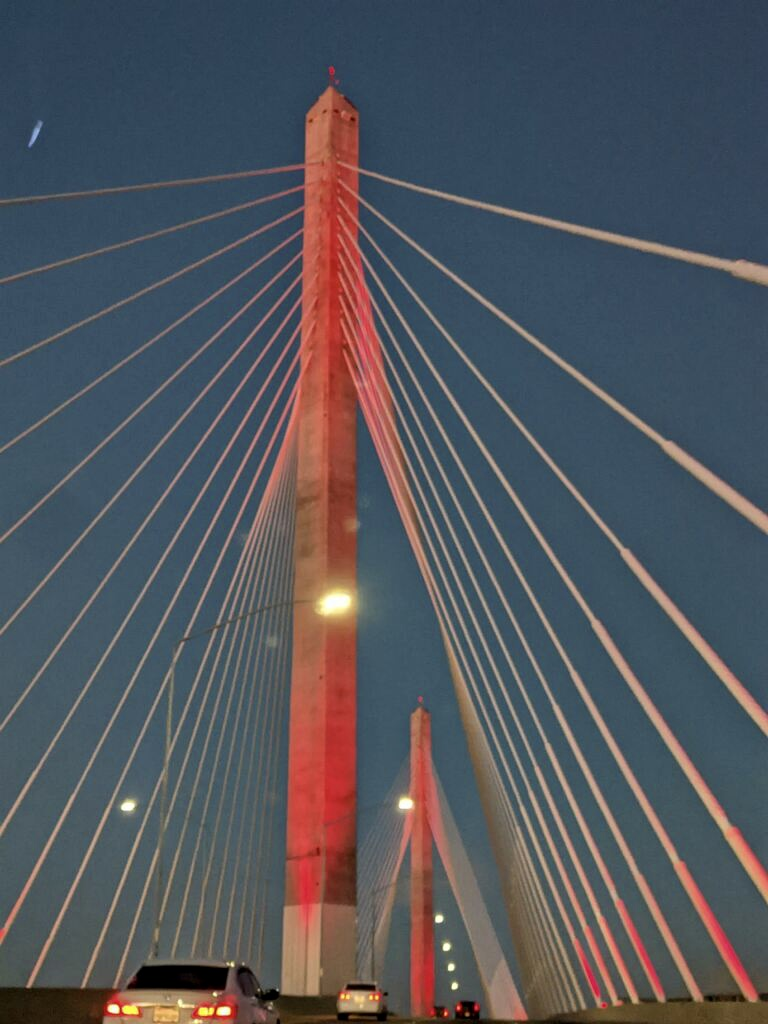
- Road deck of Long Beach International Gateway at night (2022)
- Coordinates: 33.76488°N 118.22130°W
- Carries: 6 lanes of I-710, pedestrians and bicycles
- Crosses: Back Channel
- Locale: Terminal Island and Long Beach, California
- Website: newgdbridge.com
- Preceded by: Gerald Desmond Bridge

Characteristics
- Design: Cable-stayed bridge
- Total length: 8,800 ft (2,682 m)
- Height: 515 ft (157 m)
- Longest span: 1,000 ft (305 m)
- Clearance below: 205 ft (62 m)

History
- Architect: Brownlie Ernst and Marks
- Designer: Arup
- Engineering design by: Arup
- Constructed by: Shimmick/FCC/Impreglio (SFI) Joint Venture
- Construction start: January 8, 2013
- Construction end: October 2, 2020
- Construction cost: est. US$1,500,000,000 (equivalent to $2,037,410,000 in 2025)
- Opened: October 5, 2020

Location
- Interactive map of Long Beach International Gateway

The Long Beach International Gateway, originally known as the Gerald Desmond Bridge Replacement, is a cable-stayed bridge that carries six lanes of Interstate 710 and a bicycle/pedestrian path in Long Beach, California, west across the Back Channel to Terminal Island. The bridge replaced the Gerald Desmond Bridge, which was completed in 1968 and named after Gerald Desmond, a prominent civic leader and a former city attorney for the City of Long Beach.

The 1968 steel arch bridge developed numerous issues, and the Port of Long Beach decided it would be best, from an economical perspective, that the bridge be replaced. After several years of studies, a cable-stayed bridge with 205 feet (62 m) of vertical clearance to be built north of the existing bridge was identified as the preferred alternative in the final environmental impact report (2010 FEIR).

The new bridge allows access to the port for the tallest container ships after the older bridge is demolished. It is the first long-span cable-stayed bridge in California and the first and only cable-stayed bridge in the Los Angeles metropolitan area. For the bridge to be so tall, long approaches were required to allow trucks to cross. A joint venture of Parsons Transportation Group and HNTB performed preliminary engineering for the main span and the approaches. Earlier reports had studied and discarded various alternatives, including an alternative alignment with a new bridge south of the existing bridge, rehabilitation of the existing bridge, and a tunnel instead of an elevated bridge.

== Design ==
Illustration of the former Gerald Desmond Bridge and its cable-stayed replacement

The 1968 roadway was four lanes (two in each direction) with a fifth climbing lane on each end. The replacement bridge carries a six-lane roadway with emergency lanes on each side, and the grade has been decreased by building a longer approach, despite the higher vertical clearance over the Back Channel; the planned improvements brought the bridge up to current freeway standards.

The 1968 bridge was designated as a portion of Ocean Boulevard and was therefore operated by the City of Long Beach. When it opened to traffic on October 5, 2020, the replacement bridge was redesignated as the western (southern) extension of I-710 (extending its terminus to its intersection with State Route 47) and is now the responsibility of Caltrans, District 7.

From west to east, the new bridge spans a total of 8,800 feet (2,700 m), consisting of:

- The 2,800 ft (850 m) West Approach (3,117 ft (950 m) in the 2010 FEIR)
- The 2,000 ft (610 m) cable-stayed span, with a 1,000 ft (300 m) Main Span flanked by two 500 ft (150 m) Back Spans
- The 3,600 ft (1,100 m) East Approach (3,035 ft (925 m) in the 2010 FEIR)

By extending the approach structures, approach grades are reduced to no more than 5 percent.

As the tallest structure in the area, the 2020 cable-stayed bridge is a prominent addition to the Long Beach skyline.

== Construction ==
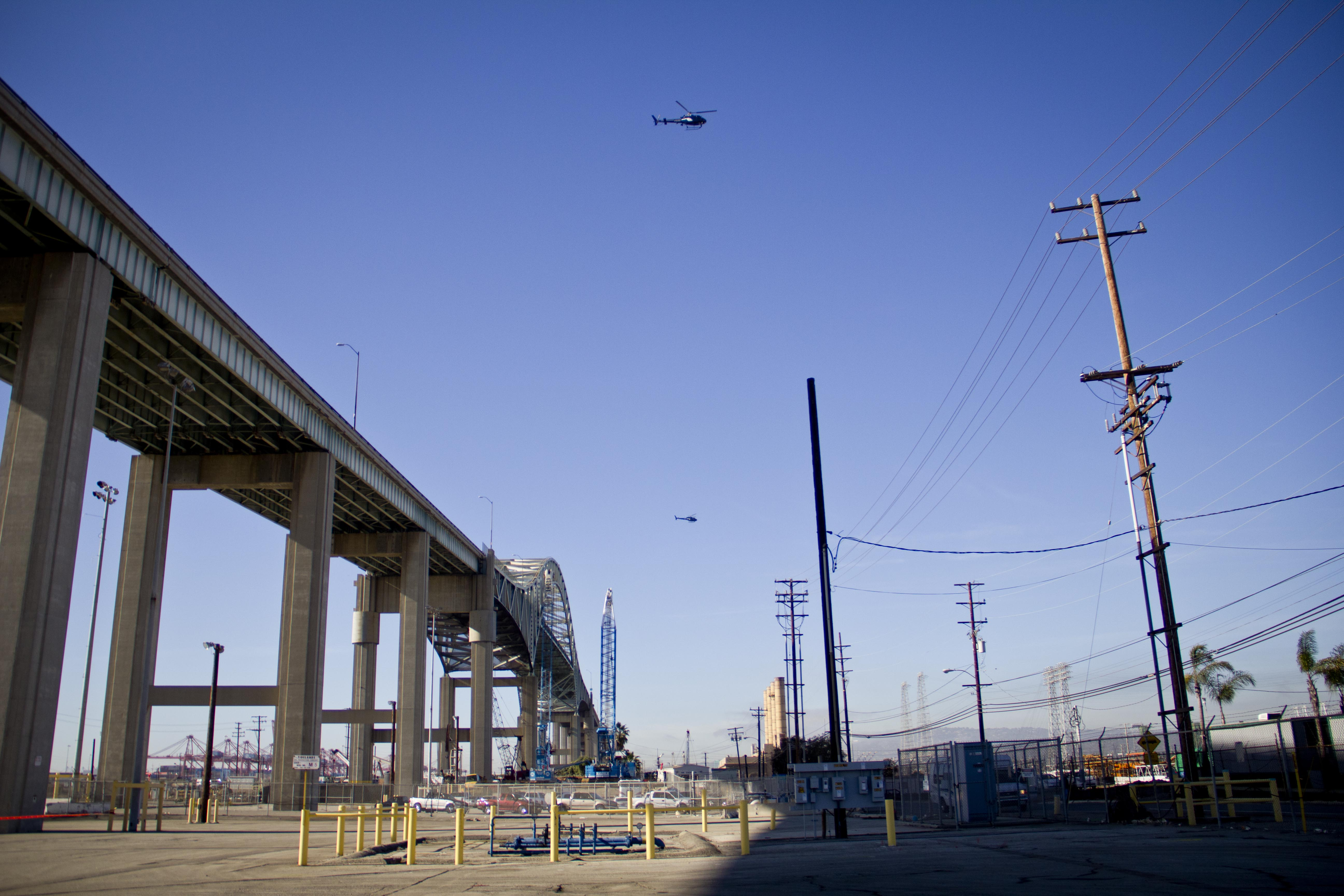
Helicopters hover 515 feet (157 m) above the ground during the January 8, 2013 groundbreaking ceremony, illustrating the height of the two cable towers in the planned replacement bridge.

The replacement bridge was unanimously approved by the City of Long Beach in late September 2010. A project launch meeting was held at the Port of Long Beach on November 22, 2010, attended by Long Beach Mayor Bob Foster, U.S. Representatives Dana Rohrabacher and Laura Richardson, Senator Alan Lowenthal and Caltrans Director Cindy McKim.

Caltrans, Port of Long Beach, and Metro officials reviewed seven potential engineering and construction firms, selecting four as qualified final lead bidders:

- Dragados USA (leading a joint venture of CC Myers, Dragados USA, FIGG Bridge Engineers and Jacobs Engineering Group)
- Kiewit Infrastructure West (leading a joint venture of Kiewit and T.Y. Lin International)
- Shimmick Construction Company (leading a joint venture of Shimmick, FCC Construction/Impregilo and Arup/Biggs Cardosa)
- Skanska (leading a joint venture of Skanska/Trayor/Massman, Buckland & Taylor, and CH2M HILL Engineers)

Three of the pre-qualified bidders submitted proposals by March 2012, with Kiewit dropping out at the bid stage. In May 2012, the Long Beach Board of Harbor Commissioners approved Port of Long Beach staff's recommendation that the “best value” design-build proposal to replace the Gerald Desmond Bridge was submitted by the SFI joint venture team, comprising Shimmick Construction Company Inc., FCC Construction S.A. and Impregilo S.p.A., and the contract was awarded to the SFI JV in July 2012. Major participants in the joint venture also include Arup North America Ltd. and Biggs Cardosa Associates Inc.

The project has been completed as a design-build in contrast to the traditional design-bid-build used typically in infrastructure improvement.

During the groundbreaking ceremony on January 8, 2013, two helicopters hovered 515 feet (157 m) above ground level, illustrating the height of the two cable towers for the planned replacement bridge.

The project was originally estimated to cost $800 million in 2008. By 2010, costs had increased to $1.1 billion, and funding identified in 2010 for the replacement bridge included $500 million contributed by Caltrans, $300 million contributed by the USDOT, $114 million from the Port of Long Beach, and $28 million from Metro. As of 2016, the current project estimate is $1.5 billion.

== Construction issues ==
The new bridge was delayed shortly after breaking ground. The new piers were delayed by the relocation and/or removal of numerous old and active oil wells and utility lines, which prevented foundation work from beginning. The bridge is located in the midst of the Wilmington Oil Field, one of the most prolific oil-producing fields located in the United States.

Another part of the cost increase and schedule delay is attributed to a 2013 redesign of the support towers. Caltrans and the Port of Long Beach required the tower redesign, executed by the SFI joint venture, allegedly to ensure seismic safety and to preserve long term structural integrity. The redesign set the estimated completion of the bridge back by 12 to 18 months. Other cost increases are attributed to extra oversight required by innovative, yet contractually compliant products and materials proposed by the designers of the replacement bridge.

The roadway for the approach structures was supported during construction by an underlane self-launched movable scaffolding system (MSS), and is the first project in California to use a MSS. The MSS was designed to bridge the 235 ft (72 m) span between piers and to support the concrete as it was poured for each span. Once the concrete had cured, the MSS moved to the next pier and repeated the pour. The orange MSS was used on the western (Terminal Island) approach, and a similar blue MSS was used on the eastern approach.

== Construction progress ==
By October 2014, work had started on the pilings which would serve as foundations for the new bridge's piers. The two cable-stay support towers were started in March (eastern tower) and April 2015 (western tower). Approach spans were underway by April 2016. By August 2016, the project had passed the halfway mark, and the two cable support towers were already more than 200 ft (61 m) high. On December 5, 2017, a "topping-out" ceremony was held to celebrate the completion of the two cable support towers. A virtual opening ceremony was held on October 2, 2020. Motor vehicle traffic opened in both directions on October 5, 2020, although the bicycle/pedestrian path remains incomplete as of August 2024.

== Naming ==
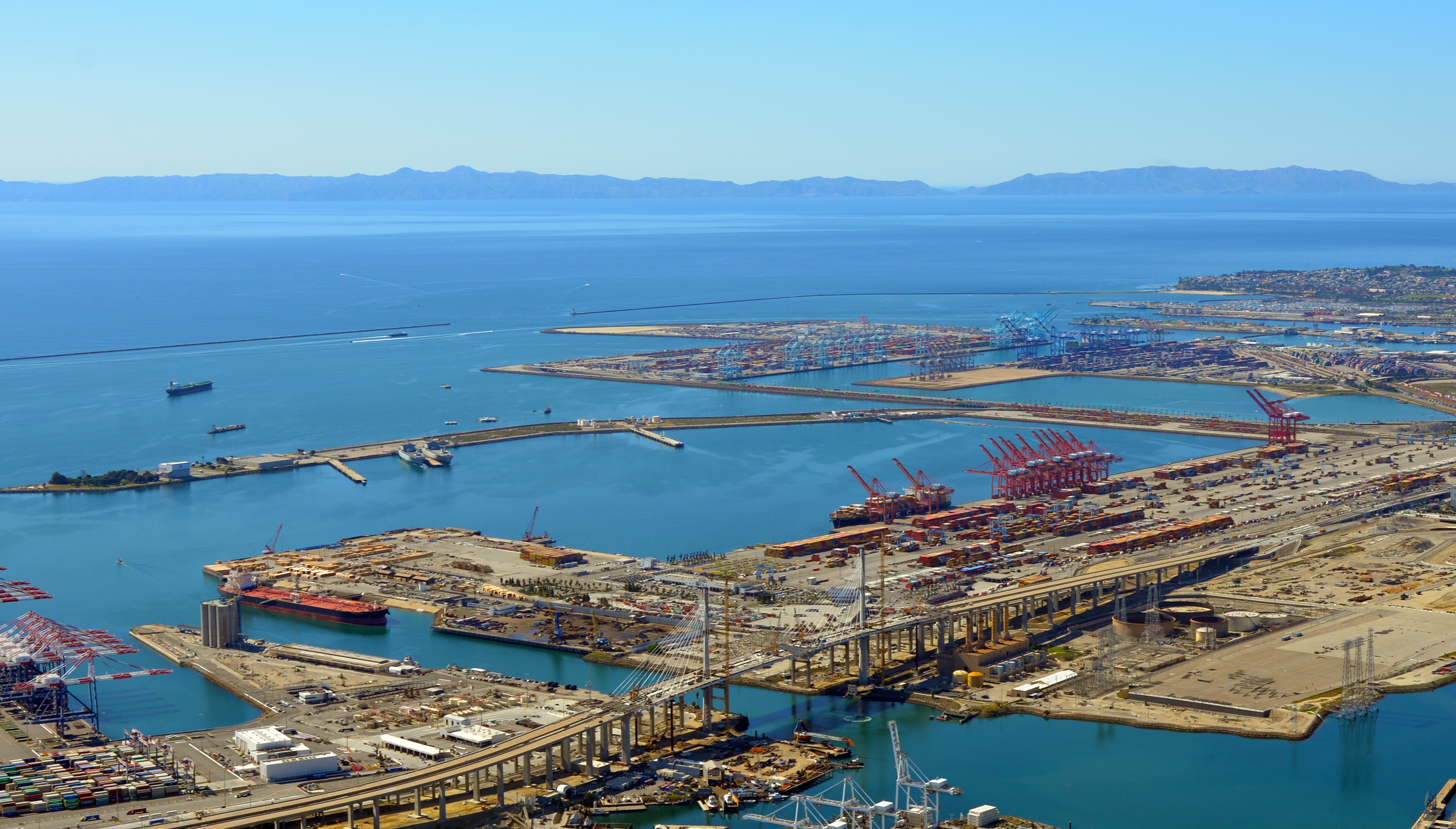
Long Beach International Gateway seen from the air, under construction in 2020.

For the first eight months after its opening, the bridge was called the Gerald Desmond Bridge Replacement. Mayor Robert Garcia and Assemblymember Patrick O'Donnell coordinated a community effort to decide if a new name was warranted. Family of Gerald Desmond and native Long Beach residents with former mayors Beverly O'Neill and Bob Foster favored keeping the original name; Foster felt a change would be disrespectful to the namesake of the original bridge, civic leader Gerald Desmond.

In May 2021, Senator Lena Gonzalez and Assemblyman O'Donnell announced that the name "Long Beach International Gateway" had been chosen through a public survey

== Bike path ==
The replacement bridge also carries the Mark Bixby Memorial Bicycle-Pedestrian Path and observation decks over the water along the south side of the bridge. The path is named for Mark Bixby, a longtime proponent of adding bike lanes to the new Gerald Desmond Bridge replacement, and a descendant of one of the original founders of Long Beach. Mark Bixby died in a March 2011 plane crash at the Long Beach Airport.

The bike-ped path opened in 2023. The route from Long Beach is called the Ocean Boulevard Connector. The bike path is also accessible from the end of the A Line. The route, adjacent to the car traffic, has a climb, resulting excellent views of the port of Los Angeles, downtown Long Beach, and downtown Los Angeles. The Wilmington side of the bridge is currently blocked off so it remains strictly a scenic route for the time being.

== See also ==
- Gerald Desmond Bridge, the bridge that it replaced
- Commodore Schuyler F. Heim Bridge
- Vincent Thomas Bridge
- List of Los Angeles bike paths
