= California State Route 47 =

State highway in California

State Route 47
- SR 47 highlighted in red; the gap represents the locally maintained segment

Route information
- Maintained by Caltrans and local governments
- Length: 3.58 mi (5.76 km) (an about 1-mile (2 km) middle segment, along with an about 7-mile (11 km) portion north of SR 103, are maintained by local or other governments, and are not included in the length)
- History: State highway, 1949-1959; SR 47 in 1964

Major junctions
- South end: I-110 in San Pedro, Los Angeles
- I-710 in Long Beach
- North end: SR 103 in Wilmington, Los Angeles

Location
- Country: United States
- State: California
- Counties: Los Angeles

Highway system
- State highways in California; Interstate; US; State; Scenic; History; Pre‑1964; Unconstructed; Deleted; Freeways
← SR 46	→ US 48

State Route 47 (SR 47) is a state highway in the U.S. state of California, connecting Terminal Island to the mainland in the Los Angeles area. From its south end at I-110 in San Pedro, it heads east across the Vincent Thomas Bridge to I-710 on the island, then turns north across the Schuyler Heim Bridge to SR 103 on the mainland. Though most maps and signs mark SR 47 as continuous along the segment from Ferry Street near the east end of the Vincent Thomas Bridge to I-710, this part has never been transferred from local control to the California Department of Transportation (Caltrans). Furthermore, SR 47 signage continues north from SR 103 along another locally maintained route, mainly Alameda Street, to the Gardena Freeway (SR 91) in Compton, and an unconstructed alignment follows the same corridor to the Santa Monica Freeway (I-10) near downtown Los Angeles.

== Route description ==
Including unconstructed segments, Route 47 is defined as follows in sections 347 and 347.1 of the California Streets and Highways Code:

347. Route 47 is from Route 110 in San Pedro to Route 10 via the Vincent Thomas Bridge.

347.1. Route 47 shall also include that portion of Henry Ford Avenue from Route 47 to Alameda Street and that portion of Alameda Street from Henry Ford Avenue to Route 91.

Route 47 shall not include that portion of the adopted route from Route 1 to Willow Street and that portion of the adopted alignment from Willow Street to Route 405.

State Route 47 begins at the south end of the Harbor Freeway (I-110) in the Los Angeles neighborhood of San Pedro and heads east to the Vincent Thomas Bridge, with only one interchange — at Harbor Boulevard — before the 1963 suspension bridge over the main channel of Los Angeles Harbor. After coming back to ground level on Terminal Island, SR 47 becomes the locally maintained Seaside Avenue at the interchange with Ferry Street, where there was a toll plaza until 2000. The freeway ends just beyond at Navy Way, after which the road enters Long Beach and becomes Ocean Boulevard, which was rebuilt as a freeway in 2007. However, SR 47 must exit the freeway onto its frontage roads, intersecting Henry Ford Avenue before turning north onto the Terminal Island Freeway. Ocean Boulevard leads east over the Gerald Desmond Bridge and becomes Interstate 710, with access to Downtown Long Beach.

State maintenance begins again on the Terminal Island Freeway, which is also signed as State Route 103. After a partial interchange with New Dock Street, only allowing access to and from the north, SR 47 crosses the Cerritos Channel on the Schuyler Heim Bridge, a lift bridge opened in 1948. Just beyond the bridge, SR 47 leaves the freeway, which continues northeast as SR 103, onto Henry Ford Avenue, and state maintenance ends. The remainder of what is signed as SR 47, along Henry Ford Avenue and Alameda Street to the Gardena Freeway (SR 91), is locally maintained. Henry Ford Avenue quickly crosses the Dominguez Channel and Anaheim Street, and merges with Alameda Street, which continues southwest into Wilmington as a local street.

The entire route is part of the California Freeway and Expressway System, and is part of the National Highway System, a network of highways that are considered essential to the country's economy, defense, and mobility by the Federal Highway Administration. The western portion is officially known as part of the Seaside Freeway, which continues to SR 1 via I-710. However, there are several at-grade intersections along the gap on Terminal Island, and Alameda Street is a surface roadway, albeit one with few intersections, as it runs alongside the Alameda Corridor rail line.

=== Alameda Street ===
The part of Alameda Street rebuilt during the Alameda Corridor project begins here, and the roadway passes under all cross streets - Pacific Coast Highway (SR 1), Sepulveda Boulevard, 223rd Street (at the San Diego Freeway/I-405 interchange), Carson Street, Del Amo Boulevard, and Artesia Boulevard (at the Gardena Freeway/SR 91 interchange) - with two-way connector ramps. The one major at-grade intersection here is the split with Santa Fe Avenue north of Del Amo Boulevard, just south of the underpass where Alameda Street moves from the east to the west side of the rail line. (Before the corridor was built, the crossover was further south, at Dominguez Street, halfway between Carson Street and Del Amo Boulevard.)

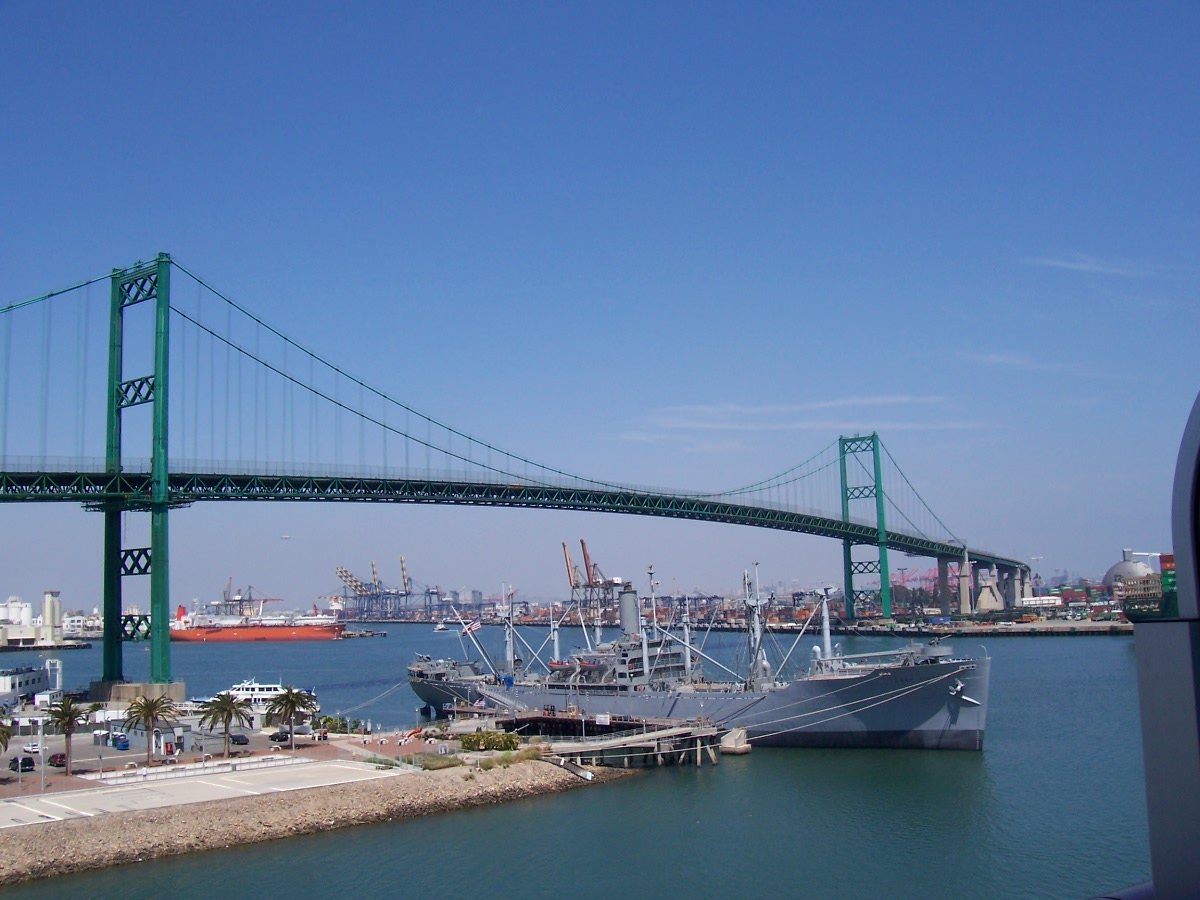
The Vincent Thomas Bridge

North of Artesia Boulevard, the rail line descends into the 10-mile (16 km) Mid-Corridor Trench, with two streets straddling it at ground level: Alameda Street to the west and a local frontage road to the east. All cross streets are thus grade-separated from the rail line while intersecting the streets at grade, except for Rosecrans Avenue, which bridges over all three. Crossings along this segment include the Century Freeway (I-105, no access), Imperial Highway, Firestone Boulevard (former SR 42), and Slauson Avenue. Just south of 25th Street, the rail line curves northeast out of the trench, and the two roadways join to become a single Alameda Street, which soon interchanges with the Santa Monica Freeway (I-10), at the north end of what is legislated as Route 47. The street continues north through the east side of downtown Los Angeles, crossing the Santa Ana Freeway (US 101) just west of Union Station, and ending soon after at Elmyra Street, where it becomes Spring Street.

== History ==
The Los Angeles County Board of Supervisors decided in mid-1916, at the urging of the Harbor Truck Highway Association (formed mid-1914), to build a Harbor Truck Boulevard stretching about 10 miles (16 km) between Los Angeles and Compton, intended to be used by trucks to the Port of Los Angeles at San Pedro. After that portion was completed, an extension to Wilmington was opened on February 2, 1924, resulting in a completely independent truck route to the port. This roadway, which lay about halfway between Wilmington Avenue and Long Beach Boulevard, extended the existing Alameda Street, which ran along—to Slauson Avenue—and then west of the Southern Pacific Railroad's San Pedro Branch to Oris Street, the north limit of Compton. The truck boulevard continued along the west side to Dominguez Street (lying between the SP's San Pedro Branch and Pacific Electric Railway's Dominguez Line beyond Dominguez Junction), and crossed there to the east side for the rest of the route to Anaheim Street in Wilmington. There trucks could turn east and south to Terminal Island via Henry Ford Avenue, or continue southwest through Wilmington to San Pedro. The highway soon came to be known as Alameda Street all the way to Wilmington. It did not become a state highway; instead the state took over Figueroa Street (SR 11) to the west and Atlantic Avenue (SR 15) to the east.

Plans for freeways in Los Angeles County evolved from a 1937 Automobile Club of Southern California plan, which was modified by the city's Transportation Engineering Board (TEB) in 1939. The former included a single freeway connecting Los Angeles to Long Beach, beginning at Pasadena and heading south-southwest to Lynwood, then paralleling Long Beach Boulevard to Long Beach. The TEB's plan shifted this route farther east to near the present Long Beach Freeway, while keeping the route near Long Beach Boulevard as a second freeway leaving the Ramona Parkway (San Bernardino Freeway) east of downtown and heading south near Alameda Street and Long Beach Boulevard to Long Beach. This second freeway came to be known as the Long Beach Parkway or Alamitos Parkway, and connected in north Long Beach with a Terminal Island Freeway southwest to Terminal Island. Because the Long Beach Naval Shipyard was located on the island, the U.S. Navy paid for the construction of the $14 million freeway from the island to Willow Street, including the $5.3 million Schuyler Heim Lift Bridge. Construction began in early 1946, and the completed link was dedicated on January 10, 1948, replacing the older Henry Ford Bridge.

Early plans also included a north–south freeway on each side of the Los Angeles Central Business District, splitting at the merge of the Harbor Parkway (Harbor Freeway) and Venice Parkway northeast of the University of Southern California, and rejoining at the split between the Arroyo Seco Parkway (Pasadena Freeway) and Riverside Parkway south of Dodger Stadium. Initially known as the East By-Pass and West By-Pass, the latter later became part of the Harbor Parkway, while the former remained as a separate route roughly along Main Street. The state legislature added the East By-Pass to the state highway system in 1947 as Route 222. The Los Angeles City Planning Commission approved a revised master plan in mid-1955, based on various studied that had been made. A new Industrial Freeway replaced the Terminal Island Freeway and Alamitos Parkway between Terminal Island and downtown Los Angeles, where it then continued north along the former East By-Pass (which was not kept south of the Santa Monica Freeway) and the southern part of the Riverside Parkway to the interchange of the Glendale Freeway and Golden State Freeway (which had replaced the rest of the Riverside Parkway). The Industrial Freeway south of the Santa Monica Freeway became Route 270 in 1959, but the ex-Riverside Parkway piece north of the Arroyo Seco Parkway never became a state highway.

In the 1964 renumbering, the Industrial Freeway became Route 47, and the former East By-Pass became Route 241. The latter was deleted the next year, and the former was extended west from its south end on Terminal Island to San Pedro, replacing part of SR 7, which was truncated to SR 1 in Long Beach at the same time. (I-710, which later replaced SR 7, has since been re-extended to SR 47 on Terminal Island.) This extension, which had been added to the state highway system in 1949 as part of Route 231, included the 1963 Vincent Thomas Bridge. Construction on the $5.8 million freeway link from that bridge west to the Harbor Freeway in San Pedro—officially the Seaside Freeway, but called an extension of the Harbor Freeway by the media—began in March 1968, and it was dedicated on July 9, 1970. The two parts of SR 47 were, and still are, connected by the Los Angeles-maintained Seaside Avenue and Long Beach-maintained Ocean Boulevard. (A freeway upgrade of the latter was completed in June 2007, but traffic signals remain on the former and on the ramps connecting Ocean Boulevard with the Terminal Island Freeway.)

Early maps show that the Terminal Island Freeway was to extend north to the Long Beach Freeway (I-710) near the San Diego Freeway (I-405), but the location for SR 47 adopted by the California Highway Commission on January 22, 1969 led northwest from the Terminal Island Freeway's end at Carson Street to I-405 near Alameda Street, and then paralleled that street into Los Angeles. A 1982 state law specified that SR 47 shall use Henry Ford Avenue and Alameda Street between the Heim Bridge and the Redondo Beach Freeway (SR 91), rather than the adopted alignment to the east, and in 1984 the legislature created State Route 103 to replace the former alignment on the Terminal Island Freeway between SR 47 and the Pacific Coast Highway (SR 1). Due to the cancellation of the Industrial Freeway and planned port expansions, the Alameda Corridor project was created, including an improved rail line and a widening of Alameda Street from four to six lanes south of SR 91. Alameda Street was rebuilt for the project, with grade separations at most major streets south of SR 91, and is now signed as part of SR 47 there, but remains mostly four lanes. As part of a project to replace the Heim Bridge, Caltrans and the Alameda Corridor Transportation Authority plan to improve the connection near the south end of Alameda Street, possibly by building a new expressway replacement for SR 47 south of SR 1, or by extending SR 103 northwest via the originally-planned alignment to Alameda Street south of I-405.

== Major intersections ==
Except where prefixed with a letter, postmiles were measured on the road as it was in 1964, based on the alignment that existed at the time, and do not necessarily reflect current mileage. Postmile prefixes include: R reflecting a realignment in the route since then, M indicating a second realignment, L referring to an overlap due to a correction or change, and T indicating postmiles classified as temporary. Segments that remain unconstructed or have been relinquished to local control may be omitted. The entire route is in Los Angeles County.

Location	Postmile	Exit	Destinations	Notes
San Pedro, Los Angeles	R0.00	1A	Gaffey Street	Southbound left exit; southern end of SR 47; northbound entrances accessible from Miraflores Avenue and the I-110 north on-ramp
San Pedro, Los Angeles	R0.00	1B	I-110 north (Harbor Freeway) – Los Angeles	I-110 south exit 1A
San Pedro, Los Angeles	R0.43 0.72	1C	Harbor Boulevard	Signed as exit 1A northbound
Los Angeles Harbor Main Channel	0.86	Vincent Thomas Bridge		
Wilmington, Los Angeles	2.30	1B	Ferry Street	Northbound exit and entrance
Wilmington, Los Angeles	2.45	Northern end of freeway and state maintenance at the site of the former toll plaza		
Wilmington, Los Angeles	2.62		Ferry Street	Southbound exit and entrance
Wilmington, Los Angeles	2.94		Navy Way	At-grade intersection
Wilmington, Los Angeles	3.16		Berths 301–305 (Terminal Way) / Berths 401–406 (Navy Way)	Southbound exit only
Long Beach	3.50		I-710 north / Pier T (Avenue) – Piers B-J, Downtown Long Beach	Interchange; southern terminus of SR 103; southern end of SR 103
Long Beach	3.73	Southern end of freeway and state maintenance		
Long Beach	3.58	4	New Dock Street – Pier S	Southbound exit and northbound entrance
Long Beach–Los Angeles line	3.88	Schuyler Heim Bridge over Cerritos Channel		
Wilmington, Los Angeles	4.57		SR 103 north (Terminal Island Freeway) / Willow Street	Northbound left exit and southbound left entrance; northern end of SR 103 concurrency
Wilmington, Los Angeles	4.86	Northern end of freeway and state maintenance		
Wilmington, Los Angeles	6.06		SR 1 (Pacific Coast Highway)	Interchange
Carson	7.14		Sepulveda Boulevard	Interchange
Carson	8.23		223rd Street	Interchange; connects to I-405 south
Carson	8.57		I-405 north (San Diego Freeway) – Santa Monica	Interchange; former SR 7; I-405 exit 33A
Carson	8.83		Carson Street	Interchange
Carson	9.88		Del Amo Boulevard	Interchange
Compton	11.65		SR 91 east (Gardena Freeway)	Interchange; SR 91 east exit 10B, west exit 10
Compton	11.99		Artesia Boulevard to SR 91 west (Gardena Freeway)	Interchange; north end of SR 47
Compton			Alameda Street	Continuation beyond SR 91
1.000 mi = 1.609 km; 1.000 km = 0.621 mi: Concurrency terminus; Incomplete access
