= Gerald Desmond Bridge =

Through arch bridge in Long Beach, California (1968–2020)

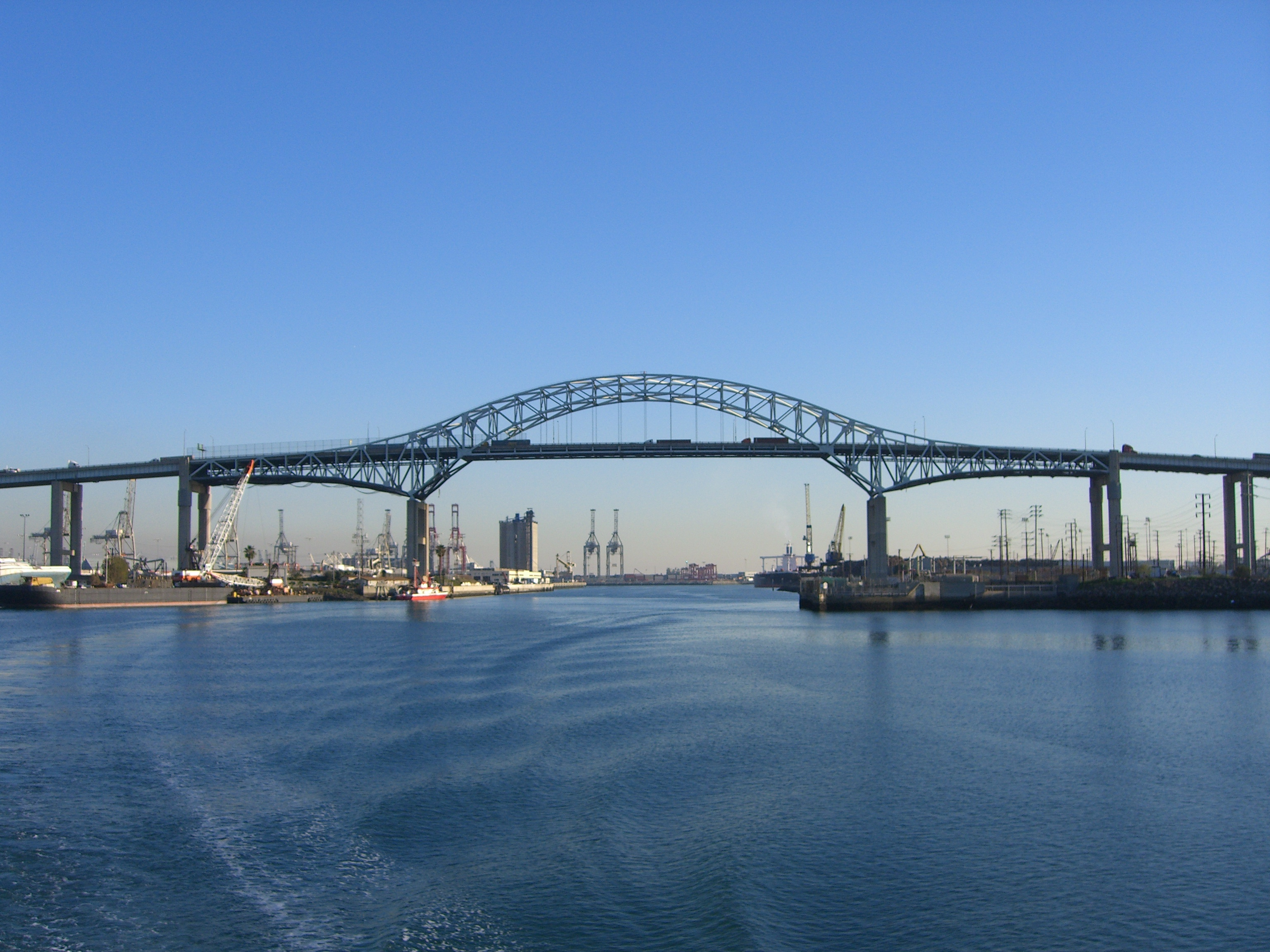
- The 1968 Gerald Desmond Bridge (pictured in 2008) spans the Back Channel, connecting Long Beach with Terminal Island.
- Coordinates: 33°45′52″N 118°13′16″W
- Carries: 5 lanes of Ocean Blvd between SR 47 and I-710
- Crosses: Back Channel
- Locale: Terminal Island and Long Beach, California
- Named for: Gerald Desmond
- Owner: Port of Long Beach
- NBI: 53C0065
- Preceded by: 1944 pontoon bridge
- Followed by: Long Beach International Gateway (cable-stayed span)

Characteristics
- Design: through arch bridge
- Material: Steel
- Total length: 5,134 ft (1,565 m)
- Width: 67.3 ft (21 m)
- Height: 250 ft (76 m)
- Longest span: 410 ft (125 m)
- Clearance above: 18.4 ft (6 m)
- Clearance below: 155 ft (47 m)

History
- Designer: Moffatt & Nichol
- Constructed by: Bethlehem Steel
- Construction start: October 19, 1965
- Construction end: June 1968
- Construction cost: US$12,700,000 (equivalent to $117,580,000 in 2025)
- Rebuilt: 1995–2000
- Closed: October 2, 2020
- Replaces: 1944 pontoon bridge
- Replaced by: Cable-stayed span

Statistics
- Daily traffic: 62,057 (2012)

Location
- Interactive map of Gerald Desmond Bridge

The Gerald Desmond Bridge was a through arch bridge that carried five lanes of Ocean Boulevard from Interstate 710 in Long Beach, California, west across the Back Channel to Terminal Island. Constructed from 1965 to 1968, the bridge was named after Gerald Desmond, a prominent civic leader and former city attorney for the City of Long Beach. In October 2020, a new cable-stayed bridge named Long Beach International Gateway replaced the old Gerald Desmond Bridge to allow taller container ships to access the ports. Demolition of the old bridge began in July 2022 and was completed in August 2023.

== Historical crossings ==
Prior to 1944, the only road access to Terminal Island was via Badger Avenue (later Henry Ford Avenue, after an assembly plant that was built on the island) over the Henry Ford Bridge.

=== 1944 pontoon bridge ===
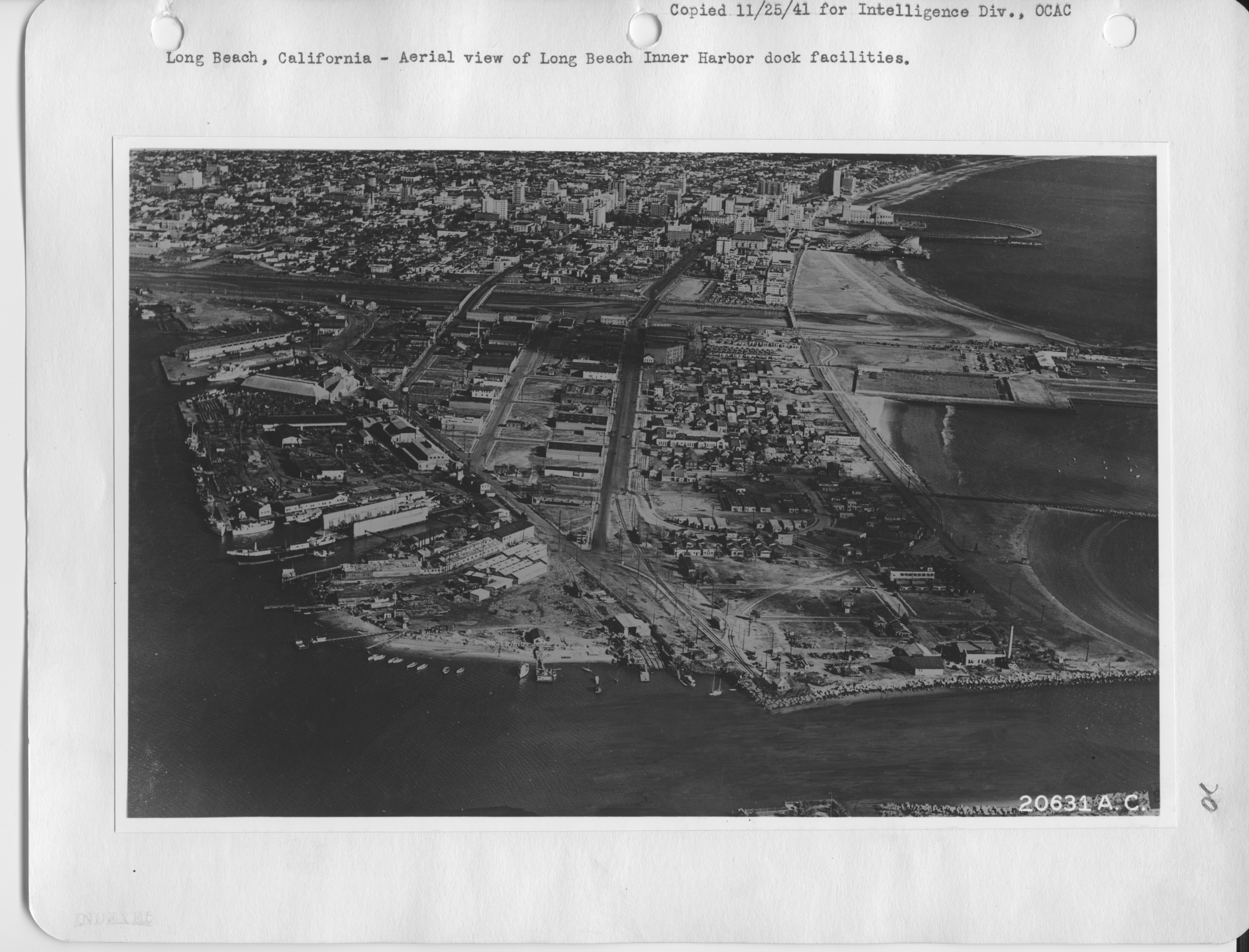
Back Channel, the Los Angeles River and downtown Long Beach, prior to the construction of the pontoon bridge

The first bridge linking the eastern end of Terminal Island and Long Beach was an unnamed "temporary" pontoon bridge constructed during World War II to accommodate traffic resulting from the expansion of the Long Beach Naval Shipyard. The pontoon bridge was intended to last six months, but was not replaced until 1968, 24 years after it had opened. Depending on the level of the tide, road traffic had to descend 17 to 25 feet (5.2 to 7.6 m) below the level on the shore. When marine traffic required the bridge to open, traffic delays of up to 15 minutes could occur. An estimated seven people died after driving off the pontoon bridge.

== 1968 through-arch ==
The 1968 through-arch bridge was designed by Moffatt & Nichol Engineers and was constructed by Bethlehem Steel as a replacement for the World War II-era pontoon bridge. Gerald Desmond served as City Attorney for Long Beach and played a significant role in obtaining tideland oil funds which helped finance the bridge that would later bear his name. Desmond died in office at age 48 of kidney cancer. One year after Desmond's death in January 1964, groundbreaking for the construction of the new bridge occurred on October 19, 1965, and it was completed in June 1968. Desmond's son, also named Gerald, sank the final "golden" bolt.

=== Design ===
It has a 527-foot-long (161 m) suspended main span and a 155-foot (47 m) vertical clearance spanning the Cerritos Channel. The western terminus of the bridge is on the east side of Terminal Island; the eastern terminus is close to downtown Long Beach. The bridge separates the inner harbor (north of the bridge) of the Port of Long Beach from the middle harbor.

=== Seismic retrofitting ===
The bridge was retrofitted with vibration isolators and additional foundation work (widening footings and adding pilings) was performed to upgrade the seismic resistance from 1996–97 prior to the transfer of ownership from the Port of Long Beach to Caltrans.

=== Issues ===
At the time of its completion in 1968, traffic was projected to be modest and mainly limited to workers commuting to jobs at the Long Beach Naval Shipyard. When the Long Beach NSY was closed in 1997, that land was converted and served as home to one of the busiest container terminals in the United States, resulting in greater cargo truck and marine traffic. By some estimates, truck traffic across the bridge tripled in the years following the closure of the Long Beach NSY. By 2010, the 155-foot (47 m) vertical clearance of the 1968 bridge was one of the lowest for a commercial seaport, especially at the Port of Long Beach, which remains one of the busiest container ports in the United States. In addition, the bridge was not designed for the traffic it carried (62,000 vehicles daily in 2012), and the added stress was causing pieces of concrete to fall from the bridge's underside, forcing the Port of Long Beach to install nylon mesh "diapers" in 2004 to catch these chunks. Studies to widen the bridge were funded in 1987. Caltrans rated the structural sufficiency of the Desmond Bridge at 43 points out of possible 100 in 2007.

Also, since the 1968 bridge roadway lacks emergency/breakdown lanes, multiple lanes would be shut down in the event of an accident, snarling traffic. Other deficiencies cited include the steep approach grades (5.5 percent on the west side and 6 percent on the east side)

Competition in the marine shipping industry meant shipping companies were interested in boosting operating efficiency, mainly by building ever-larger container ships. The Gerald Desmond Bridge became a barrier for large ships entering the Inner Harbor at Long Beach, with its restrictive 155-foot (47 m) vertical clearance. This restrictive vertical clearance was cited as a factor in an observed drop in the Port of Long Beach's share of United States container imports. According to U.S. census data, the ports of Long Beach and Los Angeles handled 32% of U.S. container imports in 2013, down from 39% in 2002. Port officials estimated that 10% of all waterborne cargo in the United States passed under the Desmond Bridge (either going to or coming from the Ports of Long Beach and Los Angeles) in 2004, raising the estimate to 15% by 2010.

In March 2012, the insufficient vertical clearance of the bridge prevented passage of the 12,562 TEU MSC Fabiola, the largest container ship ever to enter the Port of Long Beach. The height restriction prevented the ship from docking at the Mediterranean Shipping Company (MSC) dock; it docked at the Hanjin terminal instead.

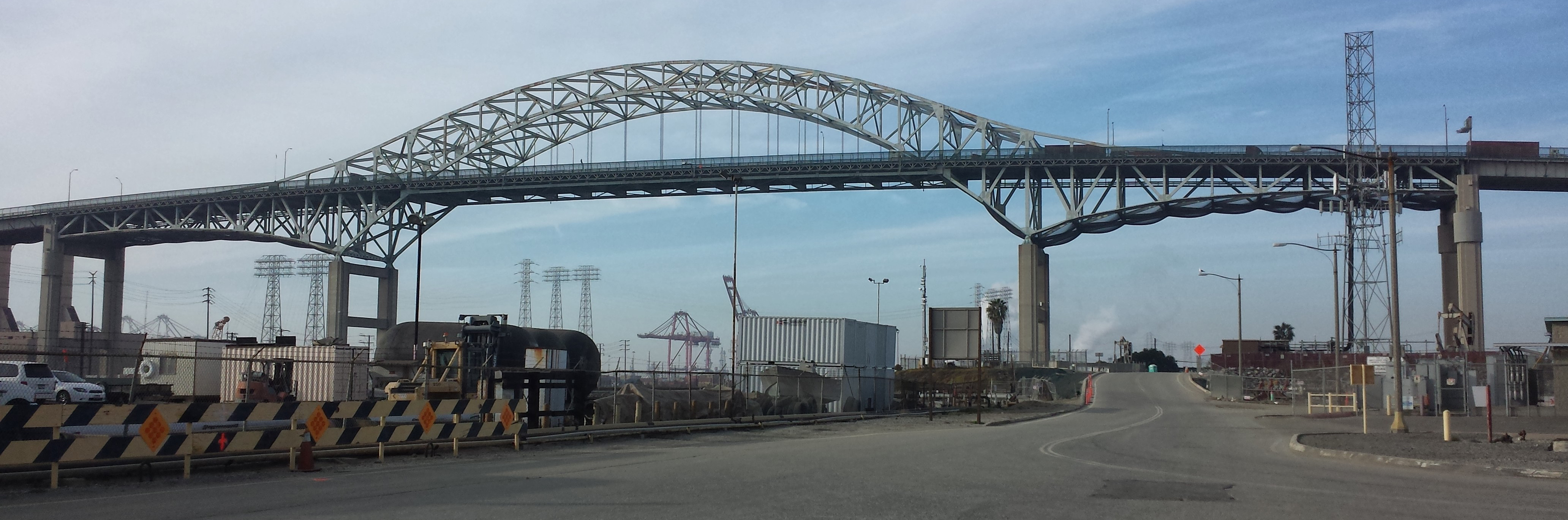
View of the old Gerald Desmond Bridge from the north, looking south-southeast. Netting is visible on the bottom of the truss spans flanking the main arch span, serving to catch chunks of decaying concrete that occasionally fall from the structure.

== Cable-stayed replacement ==
The 1968 steel arch bridge developed numerous issues (detailed above), and the Port of Long Beach suggested it would be more economical to replace the bridge. After several years of studies, a cable-stayed bridge with 205 feet (62 m) of vertical clearance to be built north of the existing bridge was identified as the preferred alternative in the final environmental impact report (2010 FEIR). The new bridge will allow access to the port for the tallest container ships, and will be the first long-span cable-stayed bridge in California, and the first and only cable-stayed bridge in the Los Angeles metropolitan area. For the bridge to be so tall, long approaches will be required to allow trucks to cross. A joint venture of Parsons Transportation Group and HNTB performed preliminary engineering for the main span and the approaches. Earlier reports had studied and discarded various alternatives, including an alternative alignment with a new bridge south of the existing bridge, rehabilitation of the existing bridge, and a tunnel instead of an elevated bridge.

== Popular culture ==
The 1944 pontoon bridge was featured in a chase scene appearing in the 1963 film It's a Mad, Mad, Mad, Mad World.

The 1968 arch bridge had a featured role in the film Head, featuring rock group The Monkees, released in 1968. The first scene of the film takes place at a bridge dedication ceremony, which is interrupted by the Monkees running into the middle of the ceremony and Micky Dolenz jumping off the bridge. At the conclusion of the film, the Monkees return to the bridge and each of them jumps from it.

Elysian Freeway Bridge, based on the 1968 arch bridge, is also featured in the 2013 video game Grand Theft Auto V. It carries the Elysian Fields Freeway in-game.

Conceptual view comparing the profiles of the 2020 (cable-stayed) and 1968 (through arch) bridges. Note taller clearance below for 2020 bridge: 205 ft (62 m) above water line, compared to 155 ft (47 m).

== See also ==
- Vincent Thomas Bridge
- Burlington Bay James N. Allan Skyway, a bridge of similar design in Ontario, Canada
- John Blatnik Bridge, a bridge of similar design in Minnesota
