= California State Route 103 =

State highway in California

State Route 103
- Terminal Island Freeway
- SR 103 highlighted in red

Route information
- Maintained by Caltrans
- Length: 6.16 mi (9.91 km)
- Existed: 1983 (from SR 47)–present

Major junctions
- South end: I-710 / SR 47 in Long Beach
- SR 47 in Wilmington, Los Angeles
- North end: SR 1 in Long Beach

Location
- Country: United States
- State: California
- Counties: Los Angeles

Highway system
- State highways in California; Interstate; US; State; Scenic; History; Pre‑1964; Unconstructed; Deleted; Freeways
| ← SR 102 | → SR 104 |

State Route 103 (SR 103) is a state highway in the U.S. state of California that forms part of the Terminal Island Freeway in Long Beach and Los Angeles. SR 103 runs from Interstate 710 (I-710) and State Route 47 (SR 47) at the former Long Beach Naval Shipyard on Terminal Island, and over the Commodore Schuyler F. Heim Bridge, to State Route 1 (Pacific Coast Highway) in Long Beach. Between I-710 and a point in Los Angeles north of the bridge, SR 103 runs concurrently with SR 47.

The Terminal Island Freeway was initially financed by the U.S. Navy to provide a connection to the Long Beach Naval Shipyard. North of SR 1 to its end at Willow Street, control of the freeway was relinquished to the City of Long Beach. For a time, this segment had the unusual unsigned designation of State Route 103U, with the U signifying "un-relinquished", because the state legislature had removed this segment from the state highway system in 1983 but the City of Long Beach did not agree to take it over until 2000. The portion is still signed as part of SR 103 instead of SR 103U.

SR 103 does not directly connect to any other freeways. It was originally planned to continue north to I-710's interchange with Interstate 405. The Terminal Island Freeway is heavily used by trucks carrying cargo to and from the Port of Los Angeles and Port of Long Beach. Because of its isolation from residential and business areas, and the industrial-looking neighborhood it runs through, the freeway is frequently used to film freeway scenes for major motion pictures. Terminator 2: Judgment Day, Mr. & Mrs. Smith, and The Fast and the Furious were three movies that used it for location purposes.

== Route description ==
The bridge carrying State Route 103, as well as 47

Route 103 is defined in section 403 of the California Streets and Highways Code, and that the highway is "from Route 47 in Los Angeles to Route 1". Despite the legal definition, SR 103 begins as a signed concurrency with SR 47 at Interstate 710 in Long Beach. At this interchange, SR 47 heads west along the Seaside Freeway towards San Pedro, I-710 goes east along the Seaside Freeway to Downtown Long Beach, the SR 47/SR 103 concurrency heads north onto the Terminal Island Freeway, and an entrance gate to the Port of Long Beach is immediately south. However, there are no direct connections between the two freeways, and drivers from the Seaside Freeway must instead exit onto frontage roads that have at-grade intersections with the Terminal Island Freeway's southern end.

The Terminal Island Freeway then follows the Schuyler Heim Bridge over the Cerritos Channel, entering the city of Los Angeles midway through the bridge. SR 103 then leaves SR 47 and reenters Long Beach, where it meets SR 1. The SR 103 state highway designation officially ends at SR 1, but the freeway, now controlled by the City of Long Beach from this point on, continues north and ends at an intersection with Willow Street.

SR 103 is part of the California Freeway and Expressway System, and is part of the National Highway System, a network of highways that are considered essential to the country's economy, defense, and mobility by the Federal Highway Administration.

== History ==
Because the Long Beach Naval Shipyard was located on Terminal Island, the U.S. Navy initially paid for the construction of the Terminal Island Freeway from the island to Willow Street, as well as the Schuyler Heim Lift Bridge. Construction began in early 1946, and the completed link was dedicated on January 10, 1948, replacing the older Henry Ford Bridge.

Prior to 1969, Route 103 was what is now State Route 15 and Interstate 15 from Interstate 5 to State Route 163 in San Diego. (I-15 was U.S. Route 395, which used SR 163, until 1969.)

The entire Terminal Island Freeway was once part of State Route 47, and was to continue north to Interstate 10 near downtown Los Angeles. SR 47 was redefined in 1983 to split from the freeway north of the Schuyler Heim Bridge, and the part from SR 47 to Willow Street became SR 103. The part north of SR 1 was later removed from the legal definition, existing for a time as State Route 103U - U for unrelinquished - before it was traded on August 25, 2000, with the city of Long Beach for Interstate 710 from SR 1 south to Ocean Boulevard. The city has since explored plans to remove this portion of the freeway.

== Exit list ==
Except where prefixed with a letter, postmiles were measured on the road as it was in 1964, based on the alignment that existed at the time, and do not necessarily reflect current mileage. Postmile prefixes include: R reflecting a realignment in the route since then, M indicating a second realignment, L referring to an overlap due to a correction or change, and T indicating postmiles classified as temporary. Segments that remain unconstructed or have been relinquished to local control may be omitted. The entire route is in Los Angeles County.

| Location | Postmile | Exit | Destinations | Notes |
|---|---|---|---|---|
| Long Beach | 3.50 (Note: Indicates that the postmile represents the distance along SR 47 rather than SR 103.) | | Berth T136 Gate 2 | Continuation beyond SR 47 |
| Long Beach | 3.50 | | I-710 north / SR 47 south – Downtown Long Beach, Piers B-J and T, San Pedro | Southern end of SR 47 overlap; south end of SR 103 |
| Long Beach | | Southern end of freeway and state maintenance | | |
| Long Beach | 3.58 | 4 | New Dock Street | Southbound exit & northbound entrance |
| Long Beach–Los Angeles line | 3.88 | Schuyler Heim Bridge over Cerritos Channel | | |
| Los Angeles | 4.57 0.00 | 5 | SR 47 north (Anaheim Street) / Pier A Way | Northern end of SR 47 overlap; northbound exit and southbound entrance |
| Los Angeles | 0.90 | | Anaheim Street | No northbound exit |
| Long Beach | 1.59 | | SR 1 (Pacific Coast Highway) – Long Beach, Santa Monica | |
| Long Beach | 1.59 | Northern end of state maintenance | | |
| Long Beach | | | Willow Street – Carson, Long Beach | At-grade intersection |
1.000 mi = 1.609 km; 1.000 km = 0.621 mi: Concurrency terminus; Incomplete access
