= Brotherhood Raceway Park =

Drag racing venue on Terminal Island, California

"Terminal Island Raceway"
- Opened: 1974
- Closed: 1995

Drag Strip
- Surface: Concrete
- Length: 0.250 mi (0.402 km)

Brotherhood Raceway Park (sometimes referred to as Terminal Island Raceway) was a ¼ mile (1320 feet, 402 m) drag racing venue on Terminal Island which is between the neighborhood of San Pedro in the city of Los Angeles and the city of Long Beach.

== Background ==
In 1974, "Big Willie" Robinson and his wife Tomiko opened the dragstrip, which hosted 1/4-mile drag racing. It opened on an old Navy airfield, paying $1,000 per month to lease the facility.

Willie opened Brotherhood Raceway Park with the motto "Run Watcha Brung," to promote the idea that all people from around Los Angeles were welcome.

Over the course of 20 years, Willie fought with the LA Harbor Commission to keep Brotherhood Raceway Park open. According to the Brotherhood, the track would open and close 11 times during this fight. The track would lose and regain the temporary lease several times but would permanently close in 1995, displaced by a coal-handling plant.

== Closing of the Racetrack ==
The LA Harbor collected an incident report of at least eight incidents between November and January 1995, which suggested safety issues with the racetrack. The alleged unprofessional management of the racetrack lost the interest of the LAPD and LAFD, who facilitated the racetrack.

Willie's 20-year connection with Los Angeles Mayor Tom Bradley was lost in 1993. Publisher of the LA Times Otis Chandler was one of the racetrack's largest advocates in local press, also seen in Chandler’s letter endorsements of Big Willie following Richard Riordan's mayoral victory in 1993. Riordan approved the renewal of the racetrack's permit in 1993. The track was closed for a final time in 1995.

== Today ==
Subsequent attempts to revive racing on the Terminal Island site, particularly after the coal facility closed, have not been successful.

The Red Bull Global RallyCross event in 2014 took place on a nearby piece of land located at the area called Out Harbor/Berth 46.

== Film and television ==
The dragstrip was featured in a 1995 episode of Visiting...with Huell Howser.

CHiPs used the dragstrip as a setting in the 1981 episode "Forty Tons of Trouble".

Willie made connections to famous figures in Hollywood in order to spread his influence. Prominent people like Arthur Newman, Paul Newman's brother, and Barry Meguiar, the host of Car Crazy, could be seen wearing Brotherhood jackets or vests.

Filmmakers from the street racing film Two-Lane Blacktop, released in 1971, also received Brotherhood clothing. Although the movie was not a box office success, it spread the influence of street racing and the Brotherhood.

== Notable Events ==
=== Star Wars Race Day 1977 ===
At the height of the popularity of "Star Wars" in 1977, "Big Willie" Robinson organized a drag racing event themed around the film franchise. Lucasfilm, the production company behind the film, supported and provided the rights to the characters in the events.

While working on the street-racing movie Two-Lane Blacktop, Willie became friends with producer Gary Kurtz. Kurtz, who produced on the set of "Star Wars," allowed Willie to use the characters at the racetrack.

Many notable figures from around Los Angeles came to see the drag race. Mayor Tom Bradley, Councilman Robert Farrell, and Tookie Williams were seen in attendance.

=== Star Wars Race Day 1980 ===
After the release of The Empire Strikes Back, Willie organized a second "Star Wars" race day in 1980. Notable characters including Darth Vader and Boba Fett shared the drag strip with Willie.

== Bibliography ==
- Coonce, Cole (May 4, 2010). Sex & Travel & Vestiges of Metallic Fragments (1st ed.). CreateSpace Independent Publishing Platform. ISBN 978-1-4528-0213-8. (Note: This is a book written by a literary journalist who writes for automotive and drag-racing magazines. It is a collection of essays, and one covers Brotherhood Raceway Park)
- Miller, Daniel (2019-07-16). "Big Willie Robinson's wild Hollywood ride: 'Star Wars,' 'Fast & Furious' and Paul Newman". Los Angeles Times. Retrieved 2024-03-22. (Note: This podcast from the LA Times details Big Willie Robinson and his events at Brotherhood Raceway Park)
- Townsend, Sylvia. Bumpy Road : The Making, Flop, and Revival of Two-Lane Blacktop. Jackson: University Press of Mississippi, 2019 (Note: The book mentions street racing in the Los Angeles port in lead by Big Willie Robinson)
- https://www.documentcloud.org/documents/6183643-L-A-Harbor-Department-files-reveal-tension-with.html (Note: The document was shared by the LA Times in support of one of their articles which suggested reasons that lead to the downfall of the Brotherhood Raceway Park)
