= Willie Robinson =

Willie Robinson may refer to:

- Willie Robinson (singer) (1926–2007), American blues singer
- Willie Robinson (jockey) (1934–2020), Irish jump jockey
- "Big Willie" Robinson (1942–2012), American street racer and bodybuilder
- Willy Robinson (born 1956), American football coach
