= Commodore Schuyler F. Heim Bridge =

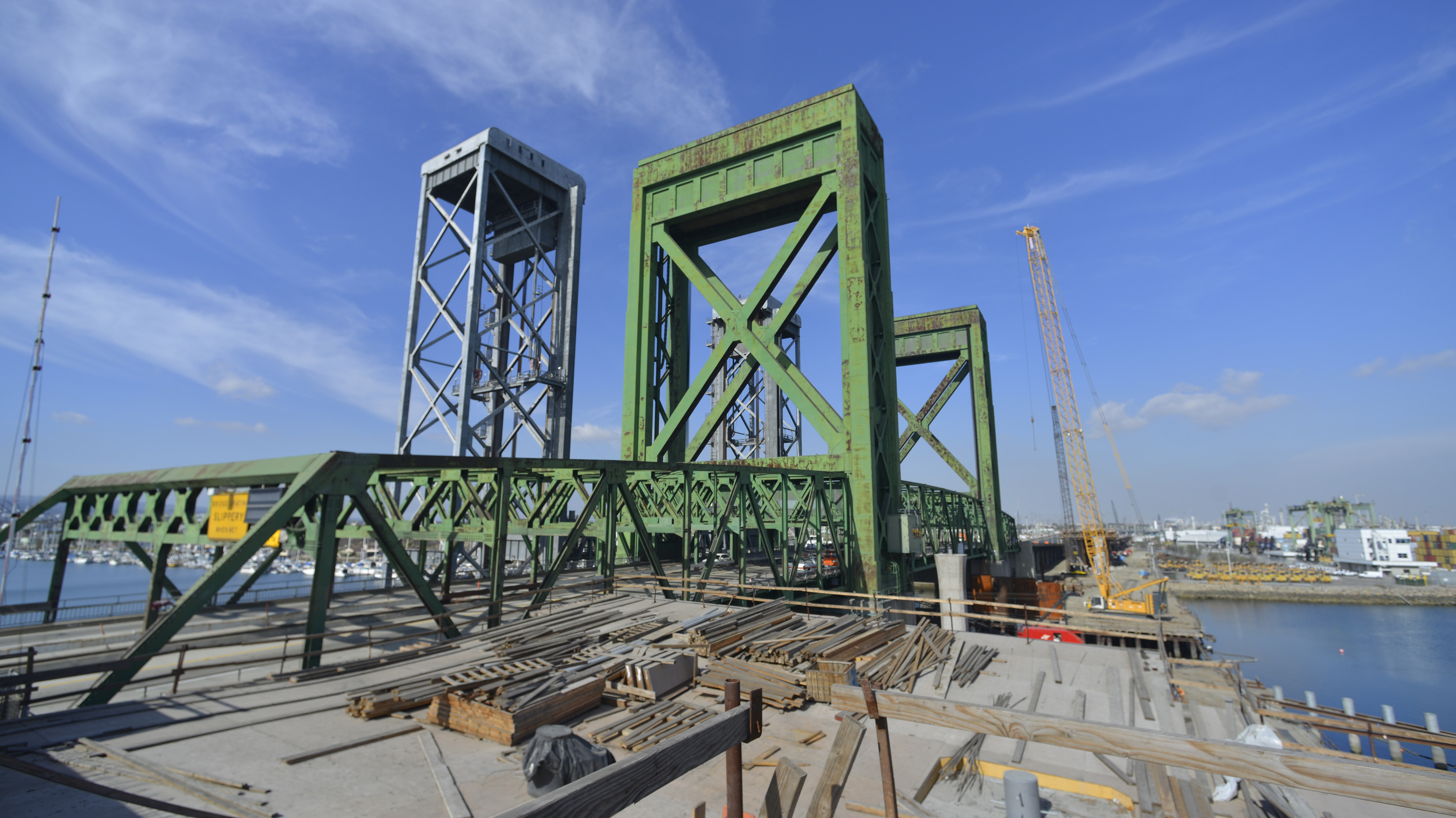
- Schuyler Heim Bridge (1948), foreground (green structure); and Henry Ford Bridge (1996), background (gray structure). Photographed in 2014, during construction of the replacement road span.
- Coordinates: 33.766111°N 118.239722°W
- Carries: SR 47
- Crosses: Cerritos Channel, Port of Los Angeles
- Locale: Wilmington, California
- ID number: 53 2618

Characteristics
- Design: Through-truss vertical-lift bridge
- Total length: 700 ft (210 m) (4,000 ft including approach viaducts)
- Width: 81 feet (25 m) (including 75 ft for the six traffic lanes)
- Height: 236 feet (72 m) tall (186 ft (57 m) above roadway)
- Longest span: 240 feet (73 m)
- Clearance below: 175 feet (53 m) fully raised
- No. of lanes: 6

History
- Opened: January 10, 1948
- Closed: October 12, 2015

Location
- Interactive map of Commodore Schuyler F. Heim Bridge

The Commodore Schuyler F. Heim Bridge was a vertical-lift bridge in the Port of Los Angeles. Dedicated on January 10, 1948, the bridge allowed State Route 47 (the Terminal Island Freeway) to cross over the Cerritos Channel. Named after Schuyler F. Heim, who was in command of the Naval Air Station on Terminal Island in 1942, the bridge was one of the largest vertical-lift bridges on the West Coast. At the time of its opening, it was the highest in the country with the deck weighing about 820 short tons (740 metric tons). Its towers are 186 feet (57 m) tall above the roadway deck and about 236 feet (72 m) tall when measured from the water level at high water. The bridge was decommissioned on October 12, 2015 and replaced by a new, six-lane fixed-span bridge in order to meet current safety and earthquake standards. A replacement bridge, tentatively titled State Route 47 Schuyler Heim Bridge Replacement, was completed in September 2020.

== History ==
=== Early connections to Terminal Island ===
The San Pedro, Los Angeles and Utah Railroad was incorporated on October 8, 1887 with the goal to build a line from Rattlesnake Island (renamed Terminal Island by 1897) on the east side of San Pedro Bay to Utah. The same "English syndicate" which had purchased Catalina Island was said to have secured the right-of-way between Los Angeles and Rattlesnake Island in 1889, with plans to have the rail line operated by the Santa Fe. However, the Los Angeles Terminal Railway, which had purchased Rattlesnake Island and the right-of-way by 1890, was the first to build tracks on the island, completing the line along the western and northern sides of the island to Long Beach on November 7, 1891, as the start of a planned transcontinental route. The line included a 1,000-foot-long (300 m) pile bridge spanning the mouth of the Los Angeles River, near the present site of the Gerald Desmond Bridge.

Since the trestle bridge effectively blocked marine traffic from passing through the east end of Cerritos Slough, the War Department ordered the Salt Lake Railroad to demolish it in 1906. Although a 3,300-foot-long (1,000 m) tunnel was proposed as a replacement in February 1907, the Salt Lake had already applied to replace the fixed trestle span with a drawbridge in September 1906. The location for the new drawbridge was set in May 1907, and the first piles were driven in December 1907. The bridge was completed in 1908 as a Scherzer Rolling Lift Bridge.

As port traffic increased, plans to widen Cerritos Slough to 1,000 feet (300 m) were advanced in 1914, connecting the Port of Los Angeles to the Port of Long Beach. However, the widened channel would require the newly-renamed Salt Lake Railroad to move its tracks on Terminal Island and remove its 1908 bridge. After several years of negotiation, a compromise was reached. After widening, the waterway was renamed Cerritos Channel. As part of the compromise, in exchange for Salt Lake moving its tracks and ceding land to accommodate the widened channel, the city took on obligations to reconstruct wharves and build a replacement bridge. That replacement bridge was completed in 1924 as the Badger Avenue Bridge (later renamed to Henry Ford Bridge), a double-leaf bascule bridge wide enough to accommodate two railroad tracks and two lanes for road traffic. The 1908 bridge was moved to Washington State in 1934, where it is still in use as a bridge for BNSF Railway over the Cowlitz River near its mouth at Longview.

Despite these early rail bridges, a road bridge was keenly desired by residents of Terminal Island, who had asked for a wagon bridge in 1894 and again in 1906.

=== 1948 Schuyler Heim vertical-lift bridge ===
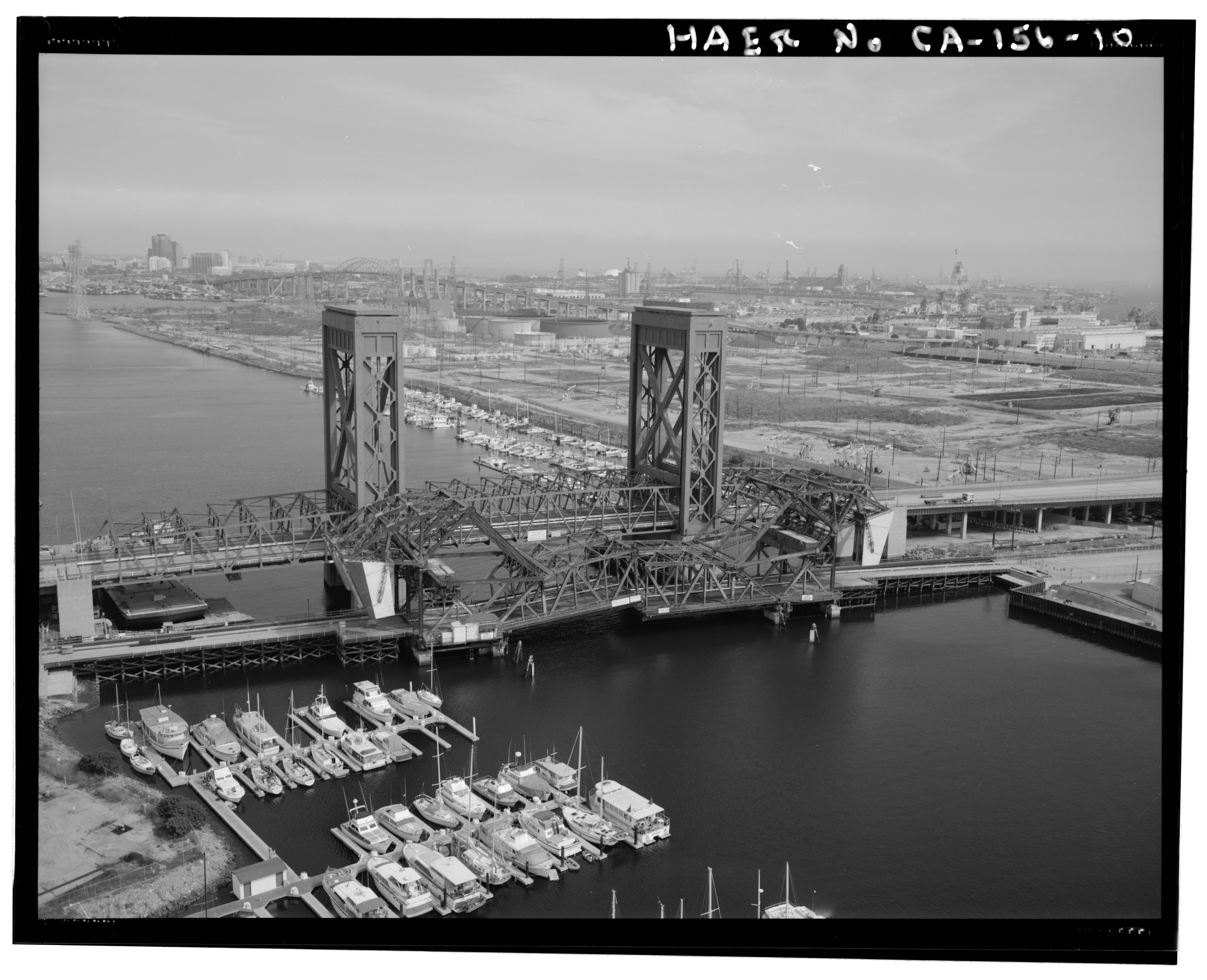
Henry Ford Bridge (1924) in foreground, Schuyler Heim Bridge (1948) in background (photographed in 1994).

1924 also saw work begin on a Naval Air Base San Pedro at Terminal Island. Port traffic continued to increase and the United States Navy began to expand its presence on Terminal Island in the early 1940s, including an expanded air base. Expansion plans for the Navy called for more workers than could be accommodated over the Henry Ford Bridge, so the Navy commissioned a new road bridge in 1941. Construction on the bridge began in 1946. The Chief Engineer for the project until October 1947 was H. E. Wilson. The bridge was named in honor of Commodore Schuyler Franklin Heim, who was in command of the Naval Air Station on Terminal Island in 1942.

The state of California took over operation of the bridge from the city of Los Angeles in 1964. As of 1988, the bridge was being raised frequently, about 8,500 times per year.

=== Replacement fixed-span bridge ===
The State Route 47 Schuyler Heim Bridge Replacement project replaced the liftspan portion of the original bridge with a fixed-span bridge. The replacement bridge has a total of six lanes for vehicular traffic, three in each direction, and span 3/4 mile (1.2 km). The new bridge will allow for a permanently navigable shipping channel, 180 ft (55 m) wide with a vertical clearance of 47 ft (14 m). Construction was expected to complete in early 2017, but was delayed to late 2020.

Although the vertical clearance is being reduced from 165 feet (50 m) with the 1948 lift bridge raised to 47 feet (14 m) with the replacement fixed bridge, the lift bridge was already unable to accommodate large cargo ship traffic. Work on the replacement bridge began in 2011 and was finished in September 2020.

== Design ==
The deck of the bridge was an open grid design to decrease weight and ease lifting of the bridge to allow ship traffic to pass underneath. The bridge used >400-short-ton (360-metric-ton) counterweights to lift the deck span portion to allow tall-masted vessels underneath.

State Route 47 and the connecting State Route 103 are heavily used by trucks to bypass part of the crowded Interstate 710 freeway. Due to the large amount of heavy truck traffic over the bridge, the deck was subject to excessive wear. The deck was completely replaced in 1997 but was still under extreme distress. The California Department of Transportation (Caltrans) installed eight experimental fiber reinforced polymer (FRP) panels and attached sensors to test stress, load bearing, and temperature variations of the panels to determine their effectiveness as a permanent replacement. Chicago-based engineering firm CTLGroup installed strain gages and thermocouples within the layers of the FRP. Each month, technicians perform a remote static load test of the bridge, providing direction to onsite Caltrans staff while monitoring real-time data from the firm's Chicago office.

== In popular culture ==
- The bridge is seen in the opening credits of the American television series Mannix. Mike Connors, playing Joe Mannix, is seen running across the bridge.
- It was also seen on an episode of the 1970s TV series Emergency!.
- The bridge plays a key role in the 1997 Made-for-TV movie Runaway Car.
- The final stand-off between Andy Garcia and Michael Keaton in the 1998 movie Desperate Measures takes place on this Bridge Desperate Measures (film).
- The bridge plays a key role in the plot of the 2010 film Inception.
- A representation of the bridge is shown in the fictional city of Los Santos in the 2013 video game Grand Theft Auto V.
- The bridge is also seen in the movie Black Sunday (1977 film).
- The bridge also makes an appearance during a chase scene in the movie Terminator 2: Judgement Day.

== See also ==
- Henry Ford Bridge — adjacent railroad bridge
- Vincent Thomas Bridge
