= "Big Willie" Robinson =

American street racer (1942–2012)

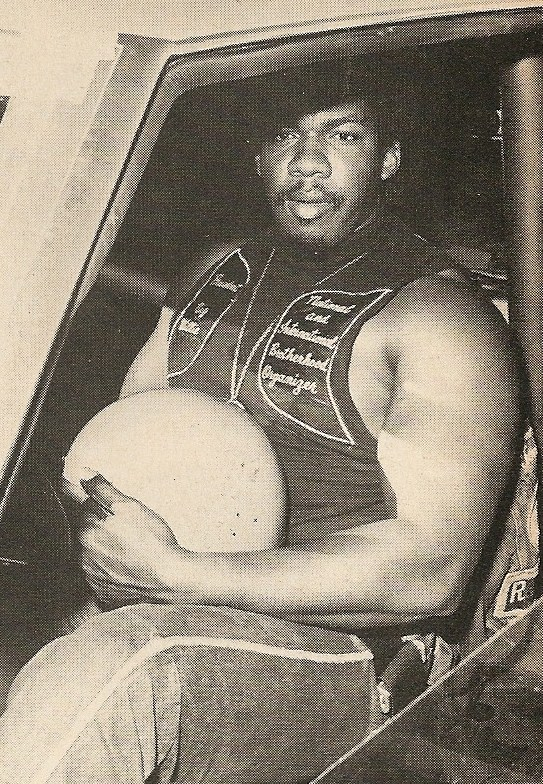
"Big Willie" Robinson in 1970

"Big Willie" Robinson (September 12, 1942 – May 18, 2012) was an American street racer, bodybuilder, and president of the International and National Brotherhood of Street Racers. He was active in the street racing community in Los Angeles, especially in the 1960s and 1970s, where he gained attention of the Los Angeles Police Department, the local media, and politicians. The Watts riots led to Robinson using drag racing as a method of addressing street violence fueled by racial tensions and police violence. He married fellow street racer Tomiko Robinson in the late 1960s, who became an integral part of the street racing community until her death in 2007. With the support of Los Angeles mayor Tom Bradley, Robinson founded Brotherhood Raceway Park in 1974 and the dragstrip maintained a presence on Terminal Island until 1994. Robinson died in 2012.

== History ==
Robinson was born and raised in New Orleans. He spent a year at Louisiana State University in 1960. Robinson recalled in 1994 how he came out of history class to find his 1953 Oldsmobile 98, a gift from his father, with its headlights and windows smashed and its tires slashed as the result of a racially motivated attack by a group of white people who were angry at the university's integration. He moved to Los Angeles in the early 1960s, where he attended UCLA. After financial difficulties following his parents' separation, he went to work at a local body shop before joining the street racing scene.

Robinson was drafted in the army during the Vietnam War and was medically discharged in 1966. He returned to Los Angeles in 1966 and returned to racing. Robinson quickly gained notoriety and became synonymous with Los Angeles street racing in the period.

After the Watts riots of 1965, Robinson founded the International and National Brotherhood of Street Racers in 1968 with support from the LAPD, whose officers first attended his drag racing events in Compton, Inglewood, and Watts undercover. Paul Norwood, executive vice president of the organization stated that "there was a lot of tension and the police thought this was a good way for the people to get rid of their anxiety and anger by allowing them to do this on weekends". The organization at its height grew to over 80,000 members in 38 states and 9 countries.

Support from Mayor Tom Bradley was instrumental in the opening of the organization's track in 1974, named Brotherhood Raceway Park. In 1977, Bradley commented: "It provides not only an opportunity to give these youngsters an outlet, but it helps build brotherhood. They are built upon the theme of brotherhood through street racing." The track closed in 1984 but re-opened again in 1993, after Robinson persuaded the Los Angeles Harbor Commission to allow its reopening for two years. Some reports from officers indicate that crime dropped when the track was open. A retired deputy sheriff stated, "pretty much all the cops knew [that] when Willie's track is open, it definitely makes a difference ... virtually all the street racing stopped because now they had a place to go." In a 1994 article for Sports Illustrated, Robinson commented: "Black, white, yellow, brown, skinheads, Nazi party members, Muslims, we got 'em all. They're all here at the track, and they're communicatin'. And once they start communicatin', they start likin' each other, and once they start likin' each other, they forget about the hate." Robinson's mantra reportedly was If you're racing, you're not killing.

In his 2012 obituary published in the Los Angeles Times, Robinson was described as "a gentle giant who promoted organized drag racing as a way to unite people of all races and classes and ease racial tensions".
