= Henry Ford Bridge =

Railroad bridge in the Port of Los Angeles, California, United States

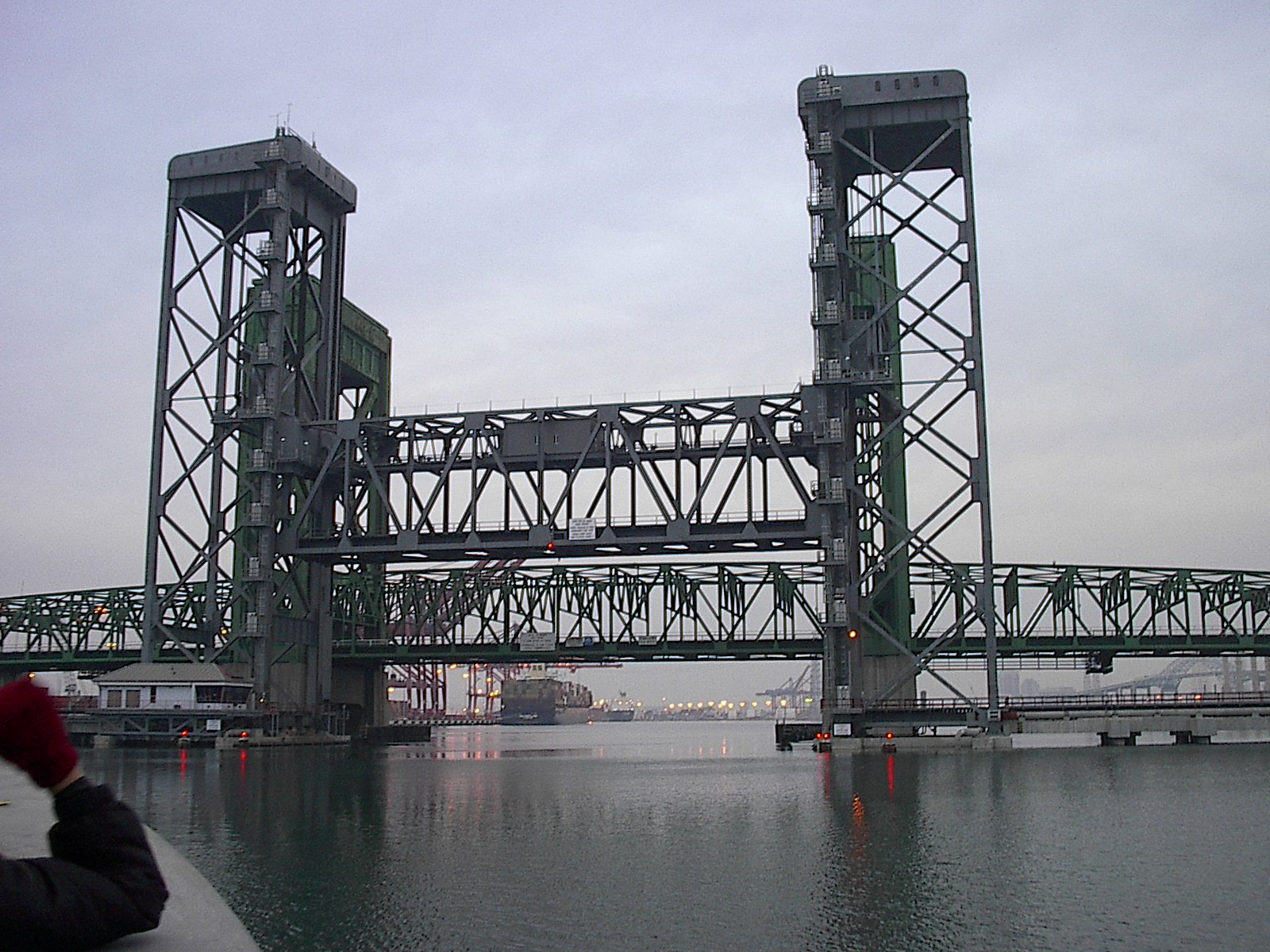
- Henry Ford Bridge (1996 replacement bridge, slightly raised, in foreground), and the Commodore Schuyler F. Heim Bridge (background), at the Port of Los Angeles.
- Coordinates: 33°45′58″N 118°14′25″W
- Carries: Pacific Harbor Line
- Crosses: Cerritos Channel
- Locale: Long Beach & Terminal Island, Los Angeles Harbor Region, Los Angeles County, California
- Other name: Badger Avenue Bridge

Characteristics
- Design: 1924–1996: bascule bridge 1996–present: vertical-lift bridge
- Clearance above: 165 feet (50 m)

History
- Opened: 1924

The Henry Ford Bridge, also known as the Badger Avenue Bridge, is a bridge located in Los Angeles County, Southern California. It carries the Pacific Harbor Line railroad across the Cerritos Channel to Terminal Island from San Pedro, to serve the Port of Los Angeles and Port of Long Beach. It was built to accommodate operations at the Ford Long Beach Assembly plant which opened in 1930 and was closed in 1959.

The original 1924 bascule bridge was dismantled and replaced in 1996 by a vertical-lift bridge.

== Bascule bridge ==
The contract for the bascule bridge was placed by The Los Angeles Board of Harbor Commissioners in 1922. The bridge was designed by Joseph Baermann Strauss and fabricated by the American Bridge Company.

It was formed of a pair of 110-foot (34 m) trunnion bascule leaves which formed a one span Warren through-truss. There were two 50 feet (15 m) tower spans and two 200 feet (61 m) timber approaches.

== Gallery ==
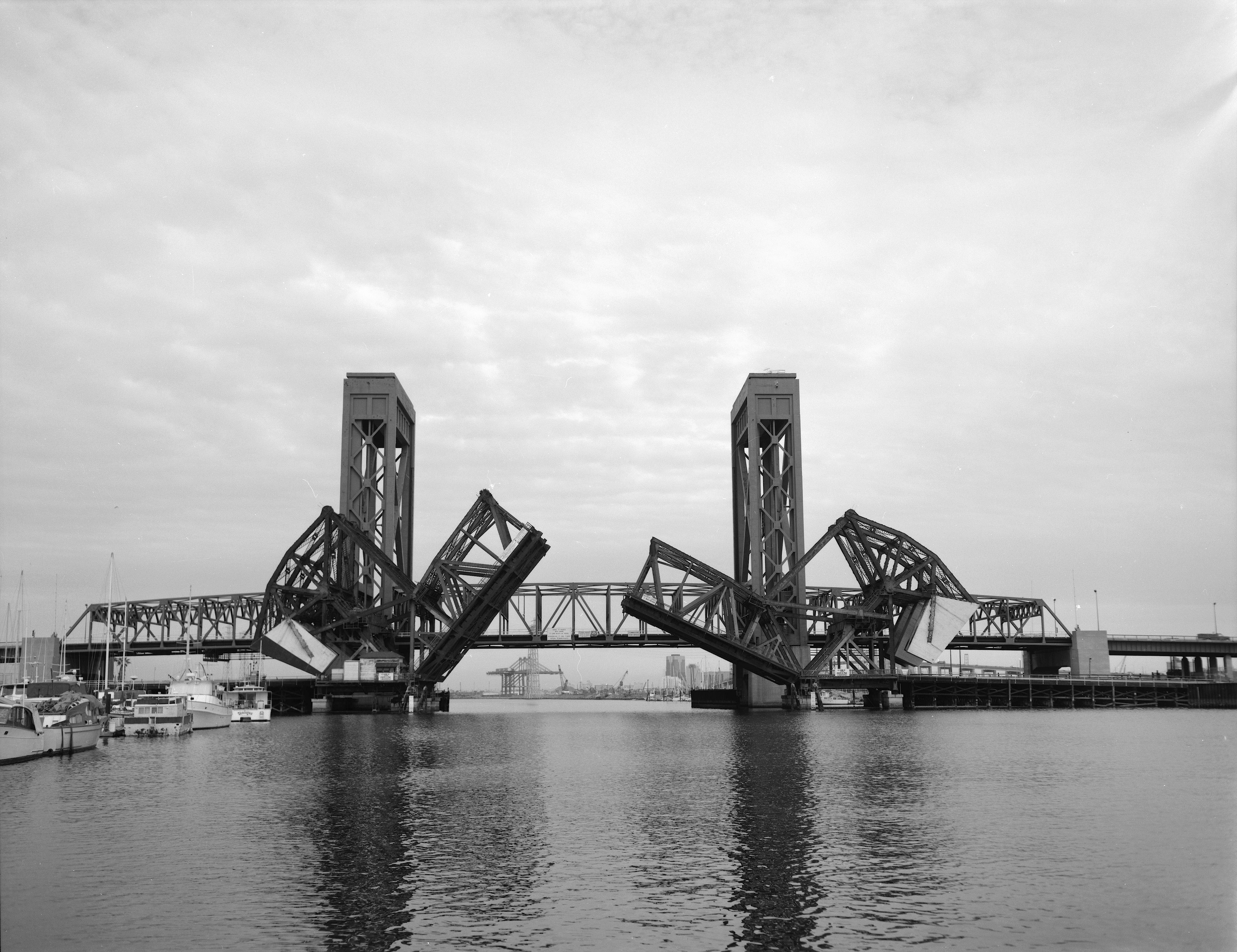
The bridge in the half-closed position, 1994

Animation of the bridge's opening and closing sequence

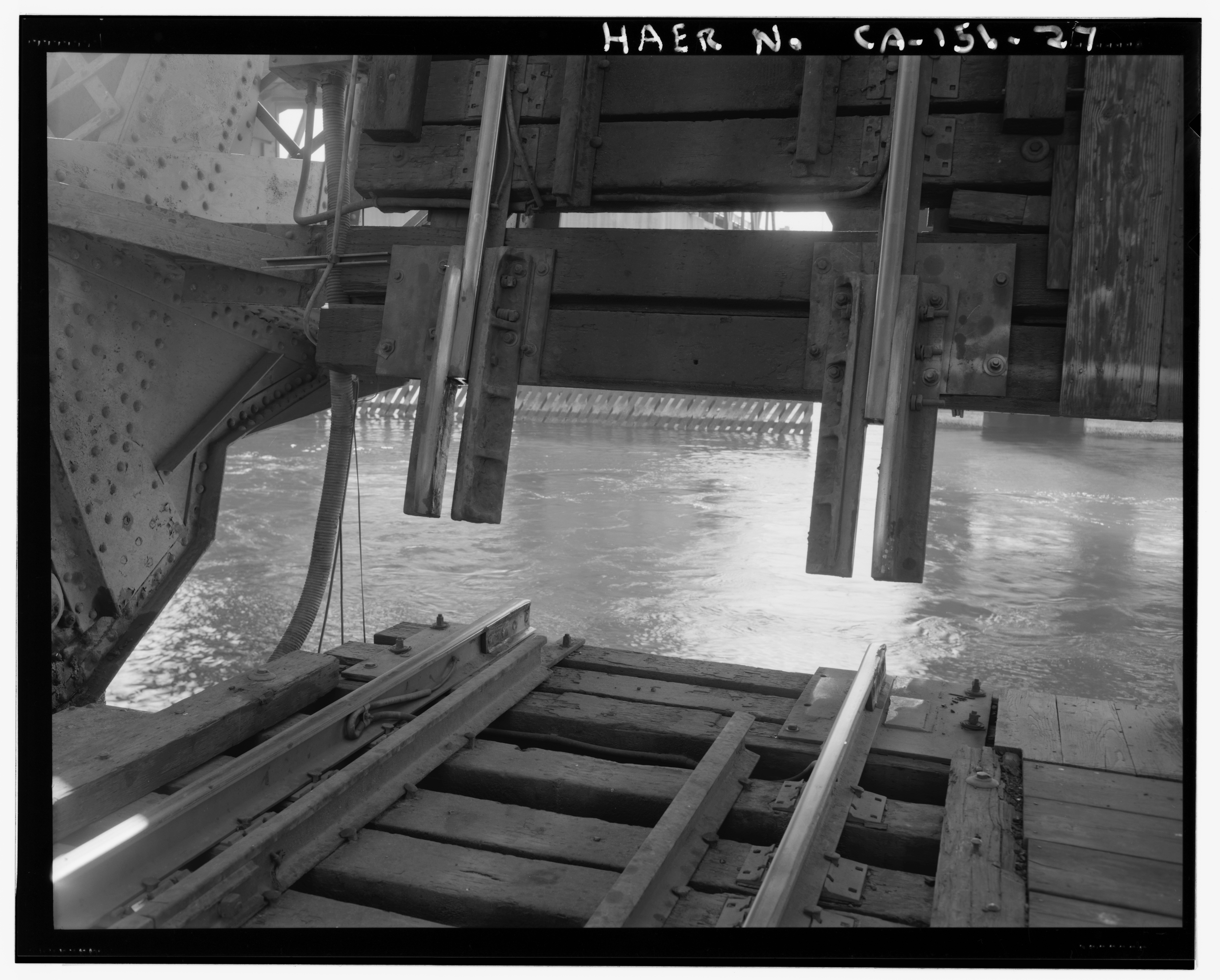
'Frogs' which match up the rail lines on the tower and the movable span as the bridge closes

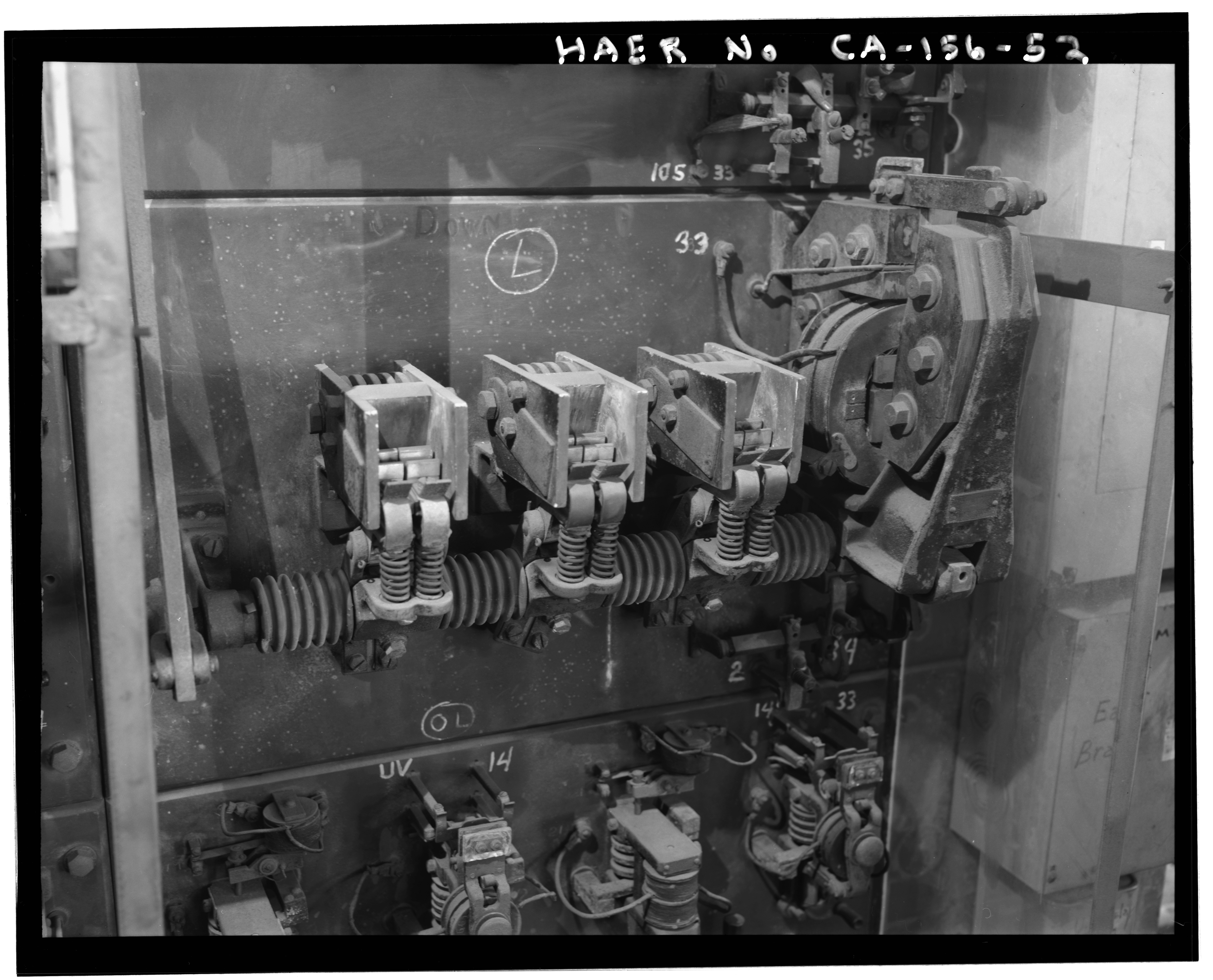
Electrical contacts

== See also ==
- Commodore Schuyler F. Heim Bridge
- List of bridges documented by the Historic American Engineering Record in California
- Vincent Thomas Bridge
- Bridges in Los Angeles County, California
