= Barry Meguiar =

American businessperson, TV host, and evangelical (born 1942)

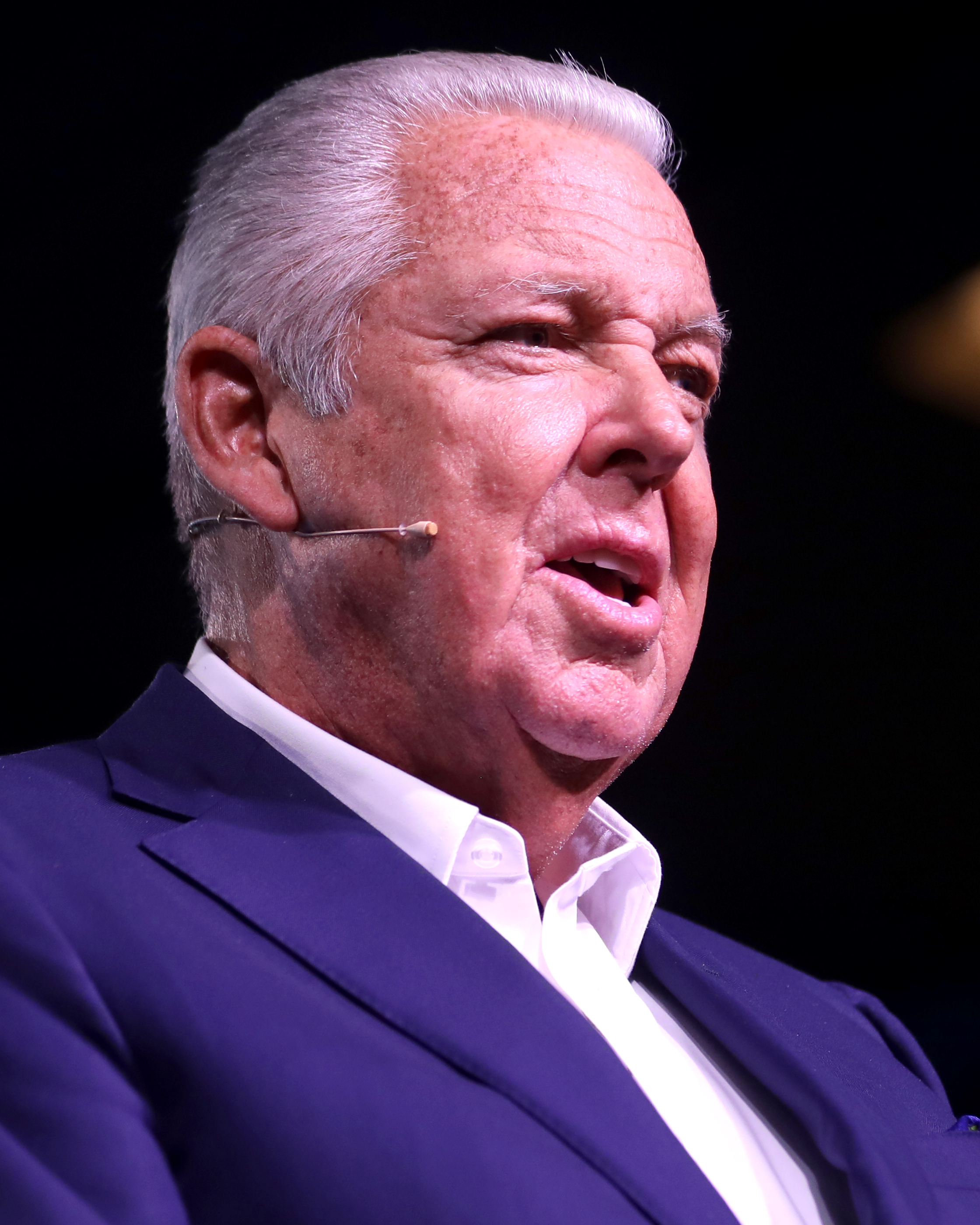
- Meguiar in 2023
- Occupations: President of Meguiar's Inc. Former TV Host of Car Crazy; Founder of Revival Outside the Walls (ROTW)
- Television: Car Crazy
- Website: www.meguiars.com www.rotw.com

Barry James Meguiar (born July 24, 1942) in Pasadena, California was the President of Meguiar's, Inc., a California-based company of car care products founded in 1901. and former host of Discovery's Velocity (TV Channel) series Car Crazy.

== Early life ==
Frank Meguiar Jr., Barry's grandfather, founded Meguiar's Inc. in the garage of his Indiana home in 1901. In 1913, Frank moved the business to Southern California, where the family focused on making products for the professional market. Barry's father, Malcolm Meguiar, and his two brothers carried on the family business in 1950. Barry's involvement at Meguiar's began in grade school and continued throughout college, when he served as the one-man accounting department generating $600,000 in annual gross sales.

After graduating from college, Barry oversaw the company's relationships with GM, Ford, and Chrysler, and managed sales in the Eastern United States. In 1969, Barry took Meguiar's products into the consumer marketplace. Barry set out to create a new brand of Meguiar's products that targeted car enthusiasts. After four years, Meguiar's Inc. launched its first consumer product, the Meguiar's Liquid Cleaner Wax, at the 1973 APAA Show in Chicago.

Barry led a grassroots program to sell his products at car shows, which grew into the international marketing campaign that became the backbone of Meguiar's global brand.

== Career ==
In mid-1990, Barry created Car Crazy, a television show for auto enthusiasts that showcases interviews with celebrities and other "car crazed" enthusiasts. Soon after its debut in August 2000, Barry created a radio show of the same name, which emulated the television show and was syndicated to approximately 100 stations throughout the U.S. by Talk America Radio Networks.

Car Crazy TV Show was the longest-running show on Fox's Speed Channel, an all-motorsports network since 1995. It was moved to broadcast through Discovery's Velocity Channel, with the ending broadcast date around 2008, when Meguiars was acquired by the 3M Corporation.

In 2008, Meguiar's Inc. was acquired by 3M, a Fortune 500 company.

=== Health and illness ===
In 2010, Barry was admitted to a hospital, where he spent the next 17 days in critical condition. He was diagnosed with a rare strain of viral pneumonia and was placed in an induced coma battling life-threatening conditions. He made a recovery within 24 hours of intensive care and the illness subsided as quickly as it had arisen.

== Revival Outside the Walls ==
Revival Outside the Walls (ROTW) was founded by Barry Meguiar in 2011 as a non-clergy, lay-led ministry. ROTW serves as an evangelical Christian organization that operates in respect to the traditional church. ROTW has a mission to serve as more of a resource than a ministry and is dedicated to providing tools for intentional faith sharing. ROTW has 60 second radio segments, the "60 Second Recharge," and features video resources to support the need for evangelism. Latest guests featured on the website include Brent Garrison, Director of CEO Relations at CEO Forum, and Dr. James Dobson, Founder of Christian radio channel Family Talk. apple

=== Religious involvement and recognition ===
- Pt. Loma Nazarene University's Alumnus of the Year
- Church Board Member, Secretary, Treasurer and Chairman
- General Council of the Assemblies of God's Layman of the Year
- Chairman of Lay Ministries for the Assemblies of God
- Chairman of David Wilkerson's World Challenge Board of Directors
- Founder/President, Revival Outside the Walls
