= Terminal Island =

Island in Los Angeles County, California, United States

Terminal Island Isla Raza de Buena Gente Rattlesnake Island
- Terminal Island. Former Gerald Desmond Bridge is visible in the right-center background.

- Location within Southern Los Angeles
- Coordinates: 33.756963°N 118.248126°W
- Country: United States
- State: California
- County: Los Angeles
- Cities: Los Angeles (Wilmington) and Long Beach
- ZIP Code: 90731

Terminal Island, historically known as Isla Raza de Buena Gente, is a largely artificial island located in Los Angeles County, California, between the neighborhoods of Wilmington and San Pedro in the city of Los Angeles, and the city of Long Beach. Terminal Island is roughly split between the Port of Los Angeles and Port of Long Beach. Land use on the island is entirely industrial and port-related except for Federal Correctional Institution, Terminal Island.

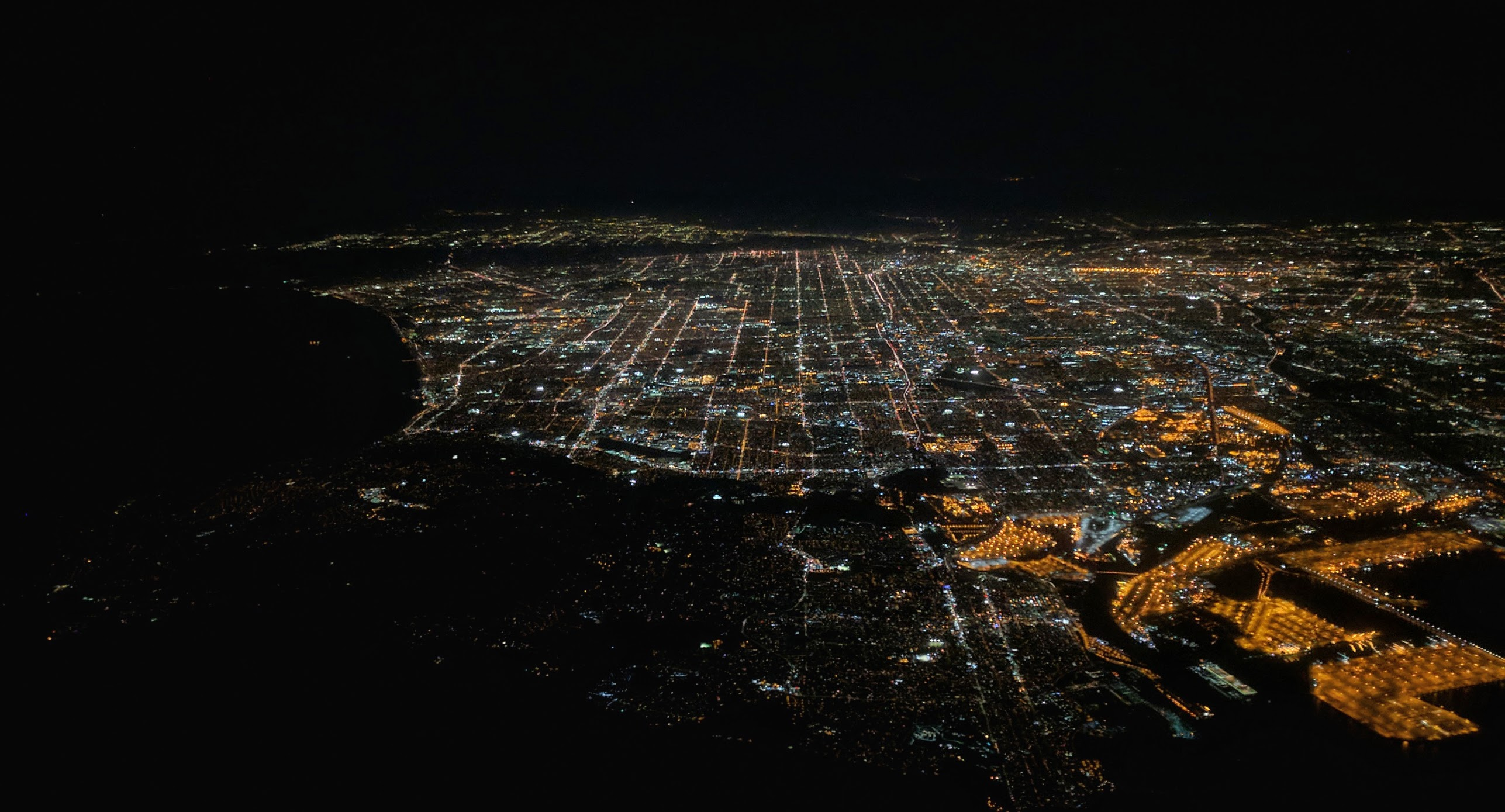
In this night-time aerial photograph of Los Angeles, San Pedro is in the center and right foreground, including part of the brightly lit Terminal Island. The dark peninsula to the left of San Pedro is Palos Verdes.

== History ==
=== Before World War II ===
The original Tongva name for the island is unknown. Spanish colonizers first named it Isla Raza de Buena Gente, and it was later known as Rattlesnake Island. It was renamed Terminal Island in 1891.

In 1909, the newly reincorporated Southern California Edison Company decided to build a new steam station to provide reserve capacity and emergency power for the entire Edison system and to enable Edison to shut down some of its small, obsolete steam plants. The site chosen for the new plant was on a barren mudflat known as Rattlesnake Island, today's Terminal Island in the San Pedro Bay. Construction of Plant No. 1 began in 1910.

The land area of Terminal Island has been supplemented considerably from its original size. In 1909 the city of Los Angeles annexed the city of Wilmington. During this time the "Father of the Harbor" Phineas Banning, held deed to roughly 18 acres of land on Rattlesnake Island. Phineas Banning was instrumental in bringing innovative changes to San Pedro Bay and made the first steps towards expansion. Once annexed with the city of Los Angeles the expansion was completed. In the late 1920s, Deadman's Island in the main channel of the Port of Los Angeles was dynamited and dredged away, and the resulting rubble was used to add 62 acres (0.097 sq mi) to Terminal Island's southern tip.

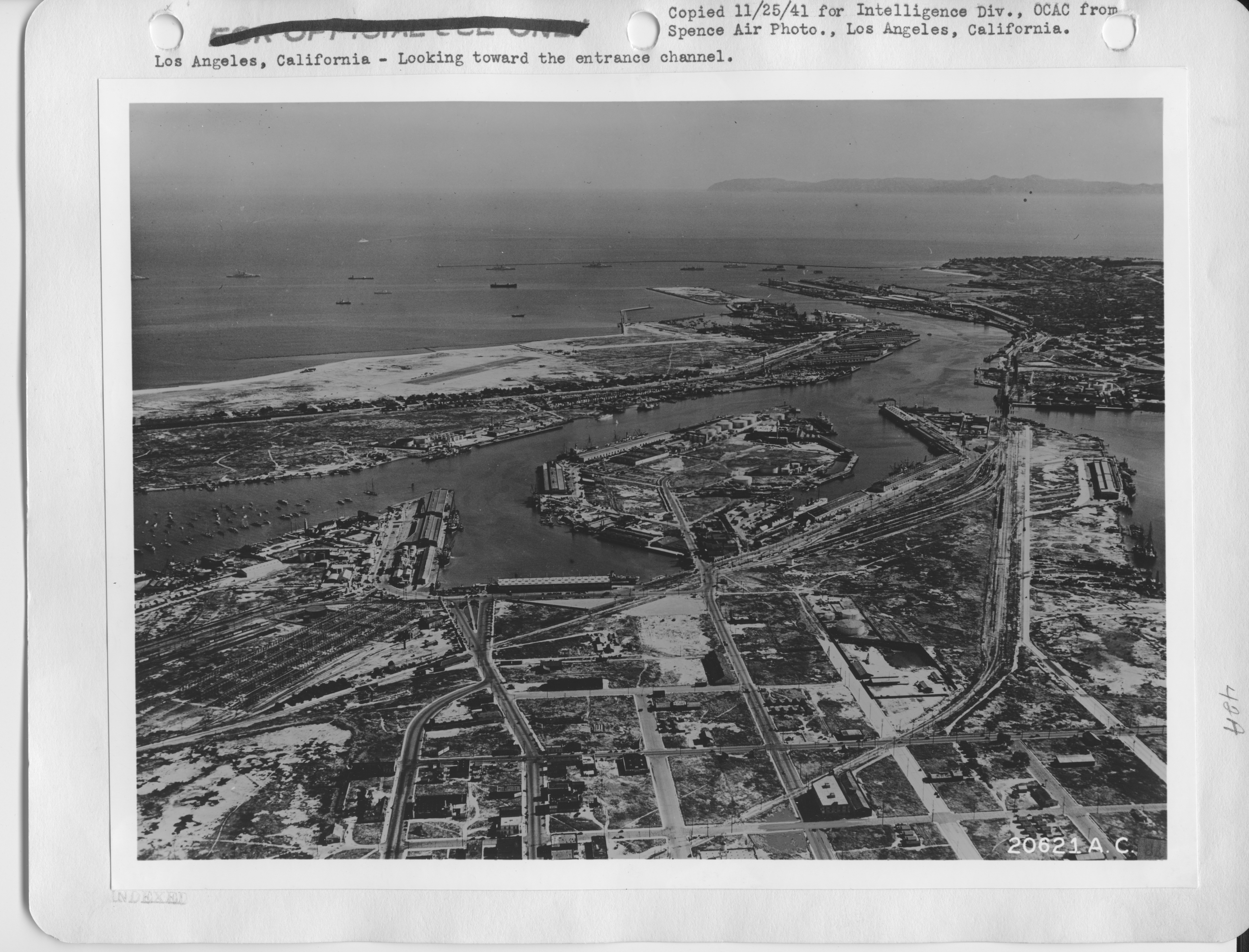
Terminal Island in the background, and Mormon Island in the foreground, sometime before 1942

In 1930, the Ford Motor Company built a facility called Long Beach Assembly, having moved earlier operations from Downtown Los Angeles. The factory remained until 1958 when manufacturing operations were moved inland to Pico Rivera.

In 1927, a civilian facility, Allen Field, was established on Terminal Island. The Naval Reserve established a training center at the field and later took complete control, designating the field Naval Air Base San Pedro (also called Reeves Field). In 1941, the Long Beach Naval Station was located adjacent to the airfield. In 1942, the Naval Reserve Training Facility was transferred, and a year later NAB San Pedro's status was downgraded to a Naval Air Station (NAS Terminal Island). Reeves Field as a Naval Air Station was disestablished in 1947, although the adjacent Long Beach Naval Station continued to use Reeves Field as an auxiliary airfield until the late 1990s. A large industrial facility now covers the site of the former Naval Air Station.

==== Japanese American fishing community ====
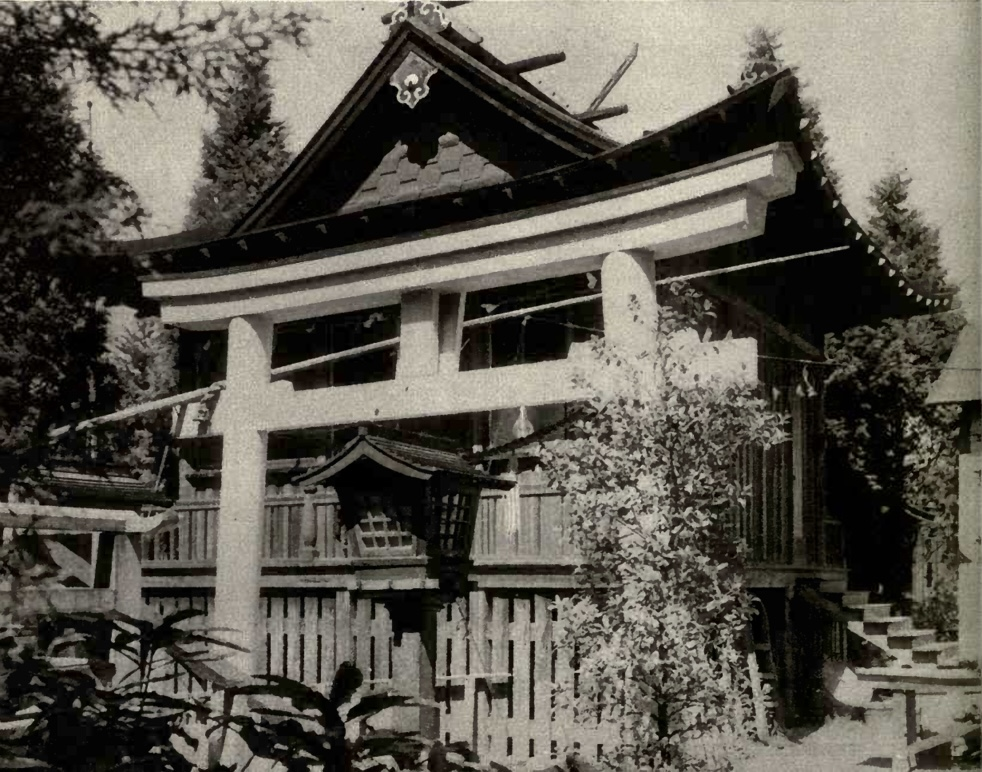
"Shinto Temple in Japanese Fishing Village Terminal Island" photographed late 1930s by the New Deal Federal Writers' Project

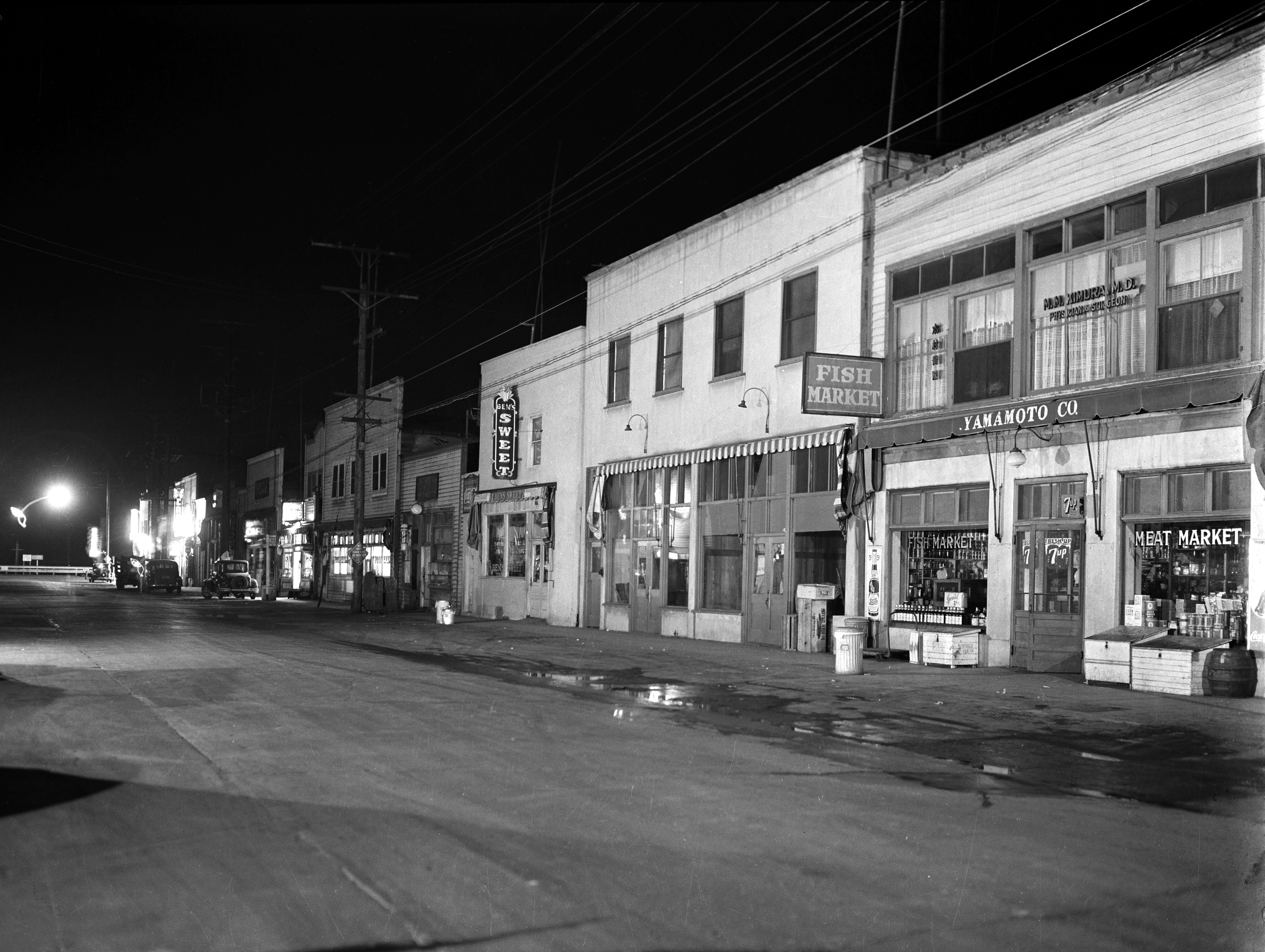
Street scene on Terminal Island, the day after the Pearl Harbor Attack. The residents were "evacuated" to inland internment camps soon after and the village was demolished.

Starting in 1906, a Japanese American fishing community became established on Terminal Island in an area known as East San Pedro or Fish Island. Because of the island's relative geographical isolation, its inhabitants developed their own culture and dialect. The dialect, known as "kii-shu ben" (or "Terminal Island lingo"), was a mix of English and the dialect of Kii Province, where many residents originated. Prior to World War II, the island was home to about 3,500 first- and second-generation Japanese Americans.

Like many Japanese immigrants, the initial settlers who came to America were Dekasegi, immigrants who intended to work a short time in the U.S then return to Japan. Many of these immigrants first arrived in Santa Monica, California with the hopes of creating a community there but after their town was burned in 1916, they moved to Terminal Island. Growing fishing interests in San Pedro's White Point and Terminal Island led many Japanese to become sought after due to their skill as fishermen and connections to the canning industry. The first major sign of the community's forming came in the form of the Southern California Japanese Fishermen's Association (SCJFA), a political and social body. On January 26, 1918, their efforts were rewarded with a completed assembly hall for the community.

The community saw political activism, particularly combatting anti-Japanese racism. One such example was the actions of bilingual intellectual Kihei Nasu, who was hired by the SCJFA to write a report refuting recent attempts by California Senator James D. Phelan that the Japanese were driving out American fishermen. Nasu said:

If the Japanese, who are only one-third of the fishermen, are driving out American fishermen, but do not only not drive out the other foreign fishermen but are actually outnumbered two to one by them? The statement of Senator Phelan seems so illogical that it should fall of its own weight.

The lands of Fish Harbor were owned by Los Angeles and leased to the canning companies who in turn built workers' housing. The workers' houses were often small wooden abodes that were very cramped and close-quartered. The main thoroughfare was Tuna Street, which was where many local businesses were housed. Fishing was integral to local ways of life, with men being absent from family for weeks or months at a time. Women and young children often worked in the canneries, which was often grueling work, needing to be done as soon as the fishermen arrived with their catch. For the children, schooling was the most important aspect of life, with the Kibei, or returning, Nisei who were sent away for education in Japan returning with the most opportunities. Cultural infusions were becoming very popular, with local baseball team the Skippetd and Kendo being popular aspects of life. Interethnic relationships were quite strong among the Japanese, particularly local white cannery owners.

On December 7, 1941, the Pearl Harbor naval base in Hawaii was attacked in a surprise air raid by the Japanese Navy, which affected the United States’ relationships with Japan and its citizens. As U.S.-Japanese relations frayed further in the late 1930s and early 1940s, nativist organizations raised new questions about the loyalty of Japanese-Americans living in the country. On February 19, 1942, two months after the attack, President Franklin D. Roosevelt signed Executive Order 9066, authorizing the removal of all people deemed a threat to national security from the West Coast to one of the ten relocation camps across the nation. Immediately after Executive Order 9066 was authorized, Japanese-Americans of Terminal Island were among the first groups to be forcibly removed from their homes. Japanese men were the first taken into custody. They were put on trains and could not see where they were being taken. Residents were given 48 hours to evacuate their homes and forced to leave everything they owned behind and relocate to detention centers. Everyone was ordered to leave Terminal Island, even if they were not Japanese, because the United States military took control of the land. As a result of their occupation and location, they were accused of being spies for the Japanese through the use of depth meters and fishing equipment prior to the attack. The United States Department of Justice and the Office of Naval Intelligence claimed that the fishermen had the ability to contact enemy vessels with their boats, radios, and equipment. The Federal Bureau of Investigation raided the homes of Japanese-Americans and searched for radios, flashlights, cameras, and morse code telegraph machines. Out of the ten relocation camps, Manzanar in the Owens Valley was where most Terminal Island residents were incarcerated.

In 1945, many of the Japanese-Americans who were interned began getting released. They were given $25 and a ticket home, but they returned to nothing and were forced to relocate. The Navy was responsible for razing the homes and structures of the Japanese Americans of Terminal Island.

In 1971, twenty-three Japanese-American former residents of Terminal Island established a new group called the Terminal Islanders. It was established in an effort to preserve the essence of their beloved community. In 2002, a memorial was established on Terminal Island by surviving second generation citizens to honor their Issei parents and preserve the memory of their hometown. Terminal Island is now protected under a perseveration plan established by the Los Angeles Board of Harbor Commissioners.

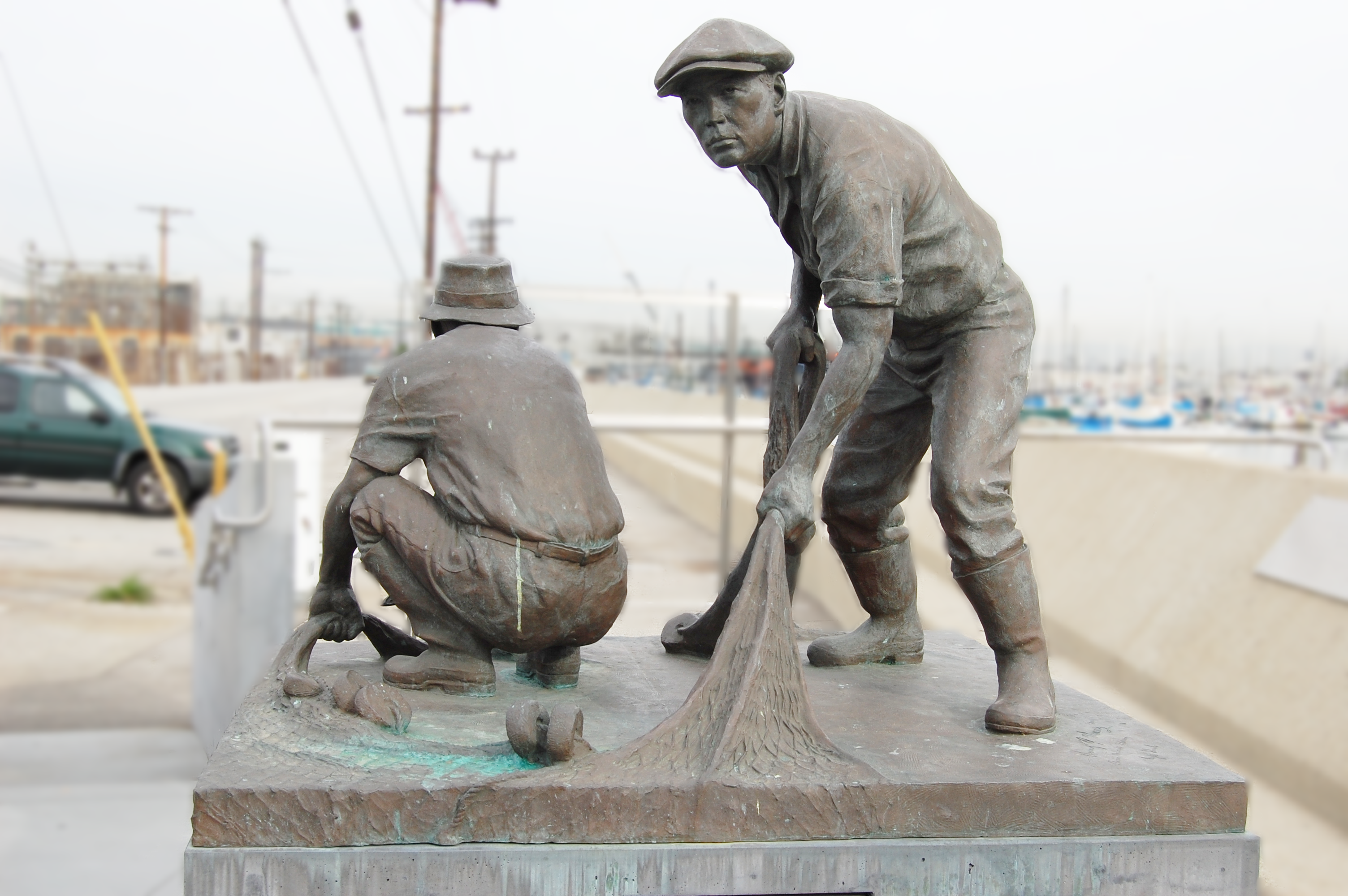
Bronze statues of Japanese fishermen, within the Terminal Island Memorial Monument

=== World War II and beyond ===
During World War II, Terminal Island was an important center for defense industries, especially shipbuilding; the first California Shipbuilding Corporation shipyard was established there in 1941. It was also, therefore, one of the first places where African Americans tried to effect their integration into defense-related work on the West Coast.

The San Pedro yard of Bethlehem Steel was also located on the Island. 26 destroyers were built there following the mobilization of the warship industry by the Two-Ocean Navy Act of July 1940. The yard was the third largest of the kind on the West Coast, behind the Seattle-Tacoma Shipbuilding Corporation (Todd Pacific) in Puget Sound and Bethlehem's own San Francisco yards (Union Iron Works).

In 1943, Los Angeles Shipbuilding and Dry Dock Company became Todd Pacific Shipyards, Los Angeles Division.

Also in the Port of Los Angeles (but not on the Island) was the Wilmington yard of Consolidated Steel.

In 1946, Howard Hughes moved his monstrous Spruce Goose airplane from his plant in Culver City to Terminal Island in preparation for its test flight. In its first and only flight, it took off from the island on November 2, 1947.

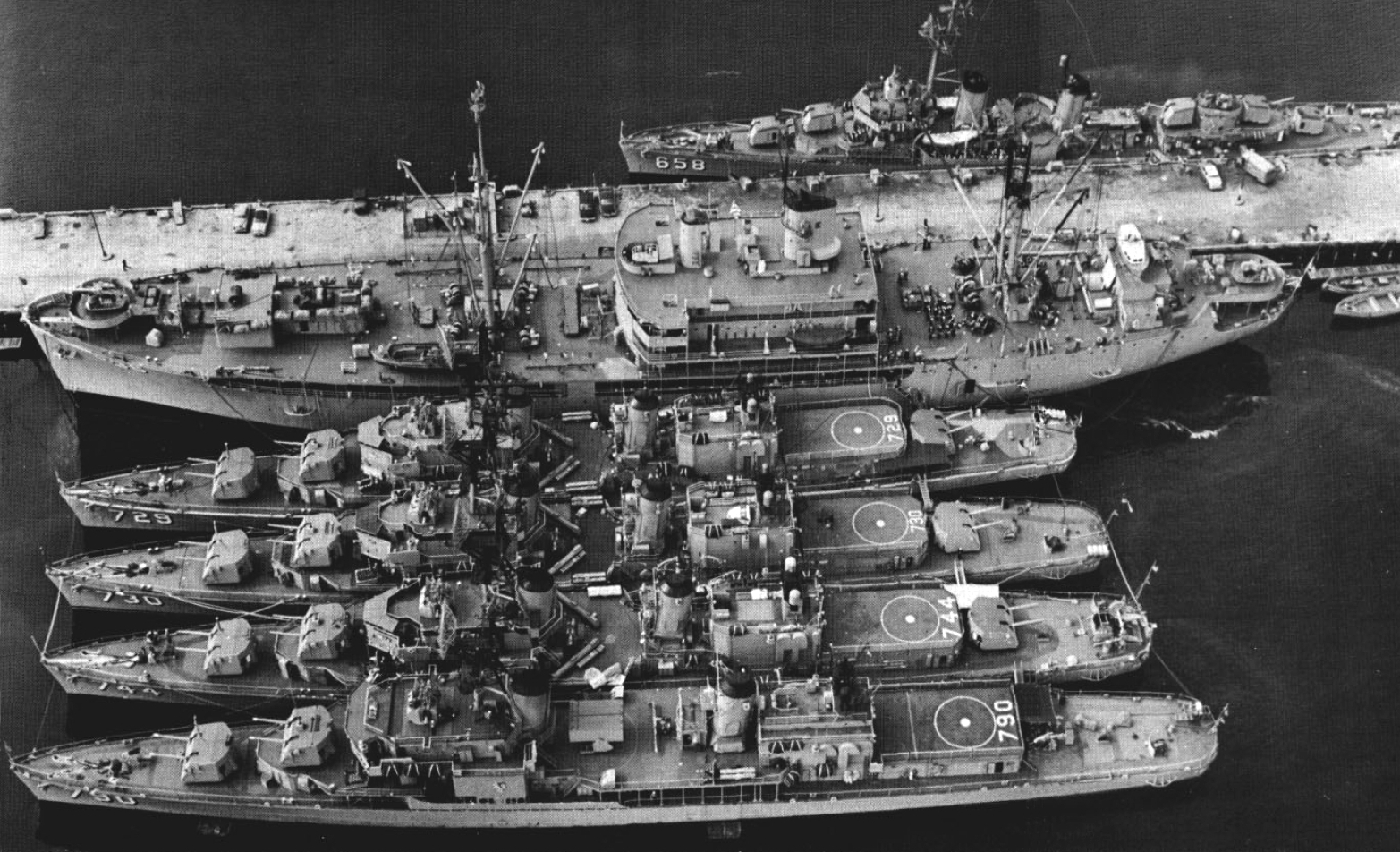
USS Bryce Canyon (AD-36) with destroyers at Terminal Island, the latter undergoing Fleet Rehabilitation and Modernization, circa 1962

Brotherhood Raceway Park, a 1/4 mile drag racing strip, opened in 1974 on former US Navy land. It operated, with many interruptions, until finally closing in 1995 to be replaced by a coal-handling facility.

Preservation of the two remaining buildings on Tuna Street with ties to the former Japanese fishing village earned the island a spot on the top 11 sites on the National Trust for Historic Preservation's 2012 Most Endangered Historic Places List. In mid-2013, the Los Angeles Board of Harbor Commissioners approved a preservation plan. The trust continued to list the site in 2025.

== Current use ==
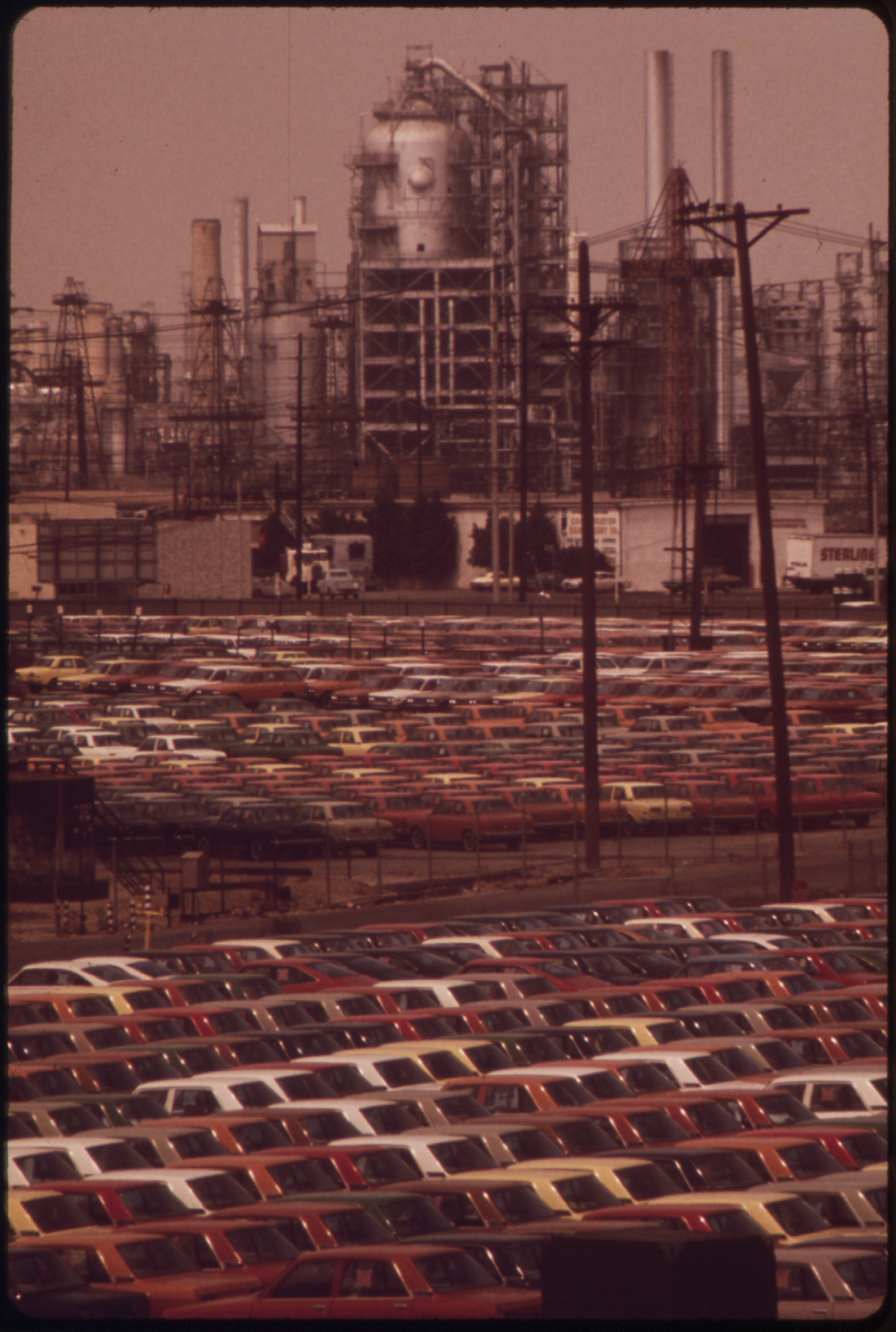
Imported Datsuns on Terminal Island, 1972

The west half of the island is part of the San Pedro area of the city of Los Angeles, while the rest is part of the city of Long Beach. The island has a land area of 11.56 km^{2} (4.46 sq mi), or 2,854 acres (11.55 km^{2}), and had a population of 1,467 at the 2000 census.

The Port of Los Angeles and the Port of Long Beach are the major landowners on the island, who in turn lease much of their land for container terminals and bulk terminals. The island also hosts canneries, shipyards, and United States Coast Guard facilities.

The Federal Correctional Institution, Terminal Island, which began operating in 1938, hosts more than 900 low security federal prisoners.

The Long Beach Naval Shipyard, decommissioned in 1997, occupied roughly half of the island. Sea Launch maintains docking facilities on the mole that was part of the naval station.

Aerospace company SpaceX is initially leasing 12.4 acres (5.0 ha) from the Port of Los Angeles on the island at Berth 240. They will refurbish five buildings and raise a tent-like structure for research, design, and manufacturing. SpaceX has been building and testing its planned Starship crewed space transportation system intended for suborbital, orbital and interplanetary flight in Texas. The new SpaceX rocket, too large to be transported for long distances overland, will be shipped to the company's launch area in Florida or Texas by sea, via the Panama Canal. The 19 acres (7.7 ha) site was used for shipbuilding from 1918, and was formerly operated by the Bethlehem Shipbuilding Corporation and then the Southwest Marine Shipyard. The location has been disused since 2005.

== Bridges ==
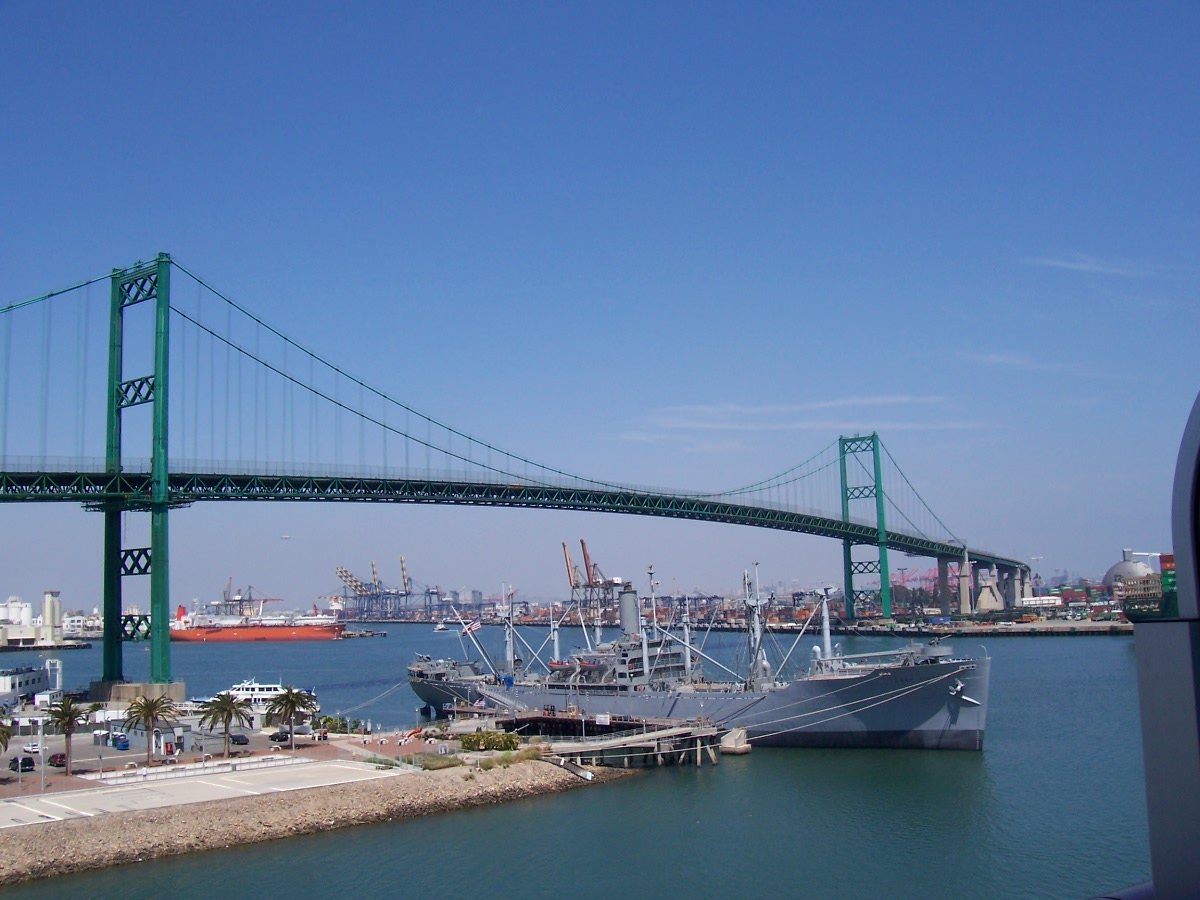
Vincent Thomas Bridge

Terminal Island is connected to the mainland via four bridges. To the west, the distinctive green Vincent Thomas Bridge, the fourth-longest suspension bridge in California, connects it with the Los Angeles neighborhood of San Pedro. The Long Beach International Gateway, the longest cable-stayed bridge in California, connects the island with downtown Long Beach to the east. The Commodore Schuyler F. Heim Bridge joins Terminal Island with the Los Angeles neighborhood of Wilmington to the north. Adjacent to the Heim Bridge is a rail bridge called the Henry Ford Bridge, or the Badger Avenue Bridge.

== In media and popular culture ==
- Industry on Parade - Continental Can Company
- a scene in Neal Stephenson's science fiction novel Snow Crash (1992)
- Visiting...with Huell Howser Episode 422 - The Tri-Union Cannery
- The Terror: Infamy
- The Fast and the Furious
- Need for Speed
- Grand Theft Auto V - Officially named the Port of South Los Santos in the game, which is set in a satirical recreation of Los Angeles called Los Santos, which is likewise set in a portion of a satirical representation of California called San Andreas, namely Southern San Andreas, as Grand Theft Auto V is a parody of Southern California

== See also ==
- List of islands of California
