= Transportation in Los Angeles =

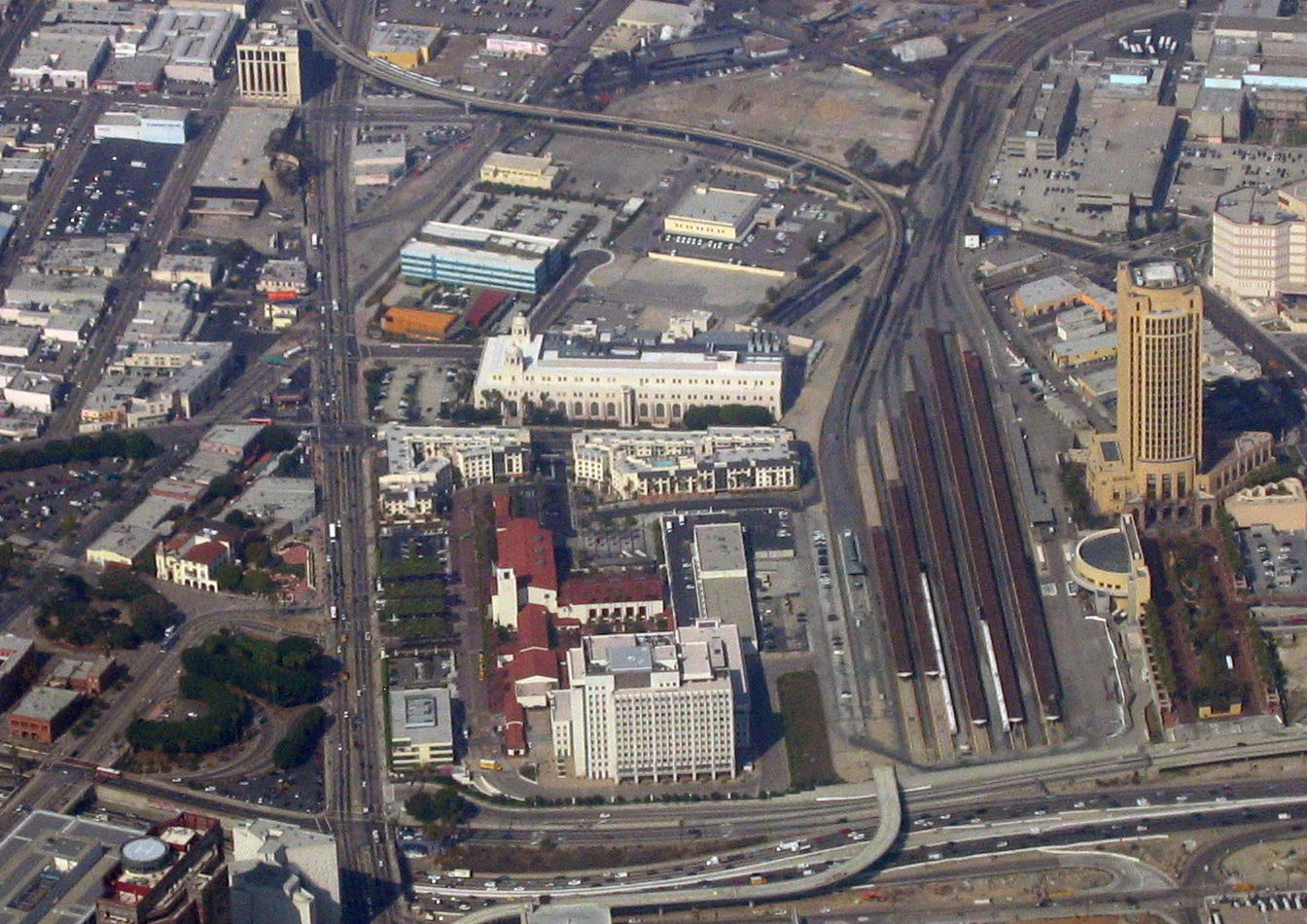
Los Angeles Union Station, hub for Los Angeles Metro trains and buses and Metrolink and Amtrak trains, and the Hollywood Freeway, one of Los Angeles' major thoroughfares

The transportation system of Los Angeles has a network of complex multimodal transportation infrastructure, which serves as a regional, national and international hub for passenger and freight traffic. The City of Los Angeles includes the United States' largest port complex, the Port of Los Angeles; an extensive freight and passenger rail infrastructure, including light rail lines and rapid transit lines; numerous airports and bus lines; vehicle for hire companies; and an extensive freeway and road system. People in Los Angeles rely on cars as the dominant mode of transportation. Since 1990, Los Angeles Metro has built over one hundred miles (160 km) of light and heavy rail serving more and more parts of Los Angeles and the greater area of Los Angeles County.

== Intercity ==
Transportation in Greater Los Angeles is a complex multimodal transportation infrastructure, which serves as a regional, national and international hub for passenger and freight traffic. The transportation system of Greater Los Angeles includes the United States' largest port complex, seven commuter rail lines, and Amtrak service. With many highways, it is integrated into the Interstate Highway System.

=== Air transportation ===
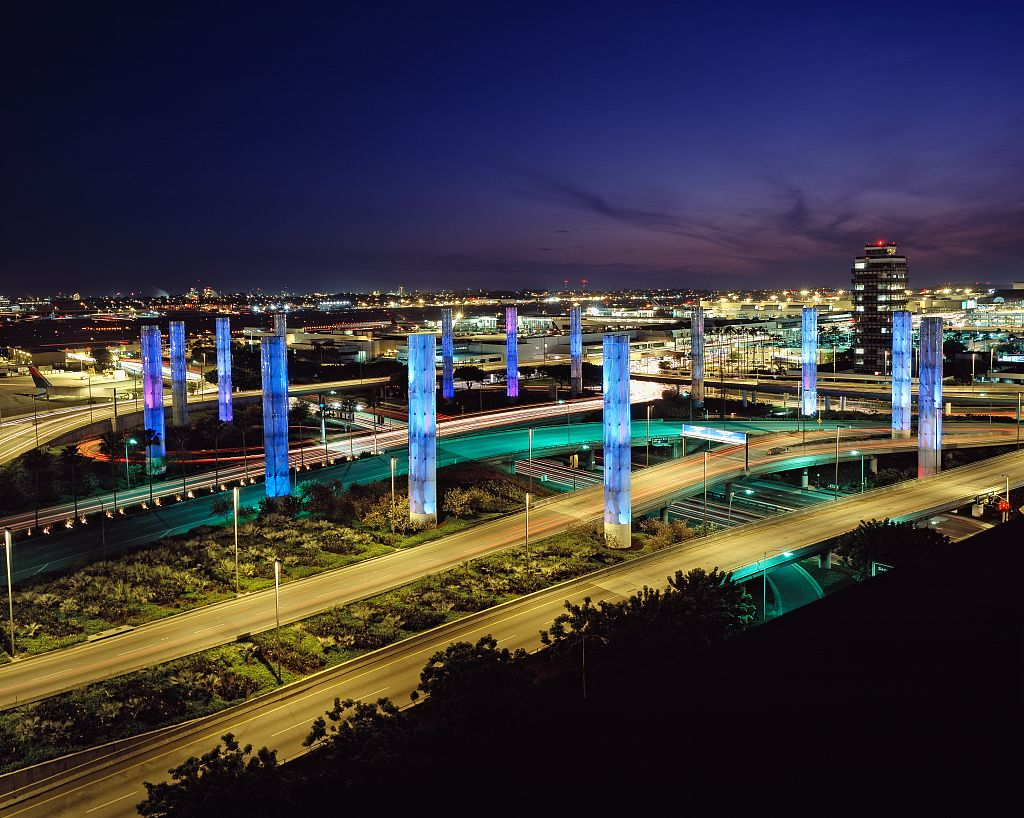
Los Angeles International Airport (LAX), the seventh busiest airport in the world

The Los Angeles metropolitan area has five commercial airports and many more general-aviation airports.

The primary Los Angeles airport is Los Angeles International Airport (LAX). The seventh busiest commercial airport in the world and the third busiest in the United States, LAX handled 28.8 million passengers, 2.3 million metric tons (2.5 million short tons; 2.3 million long tons) of cargo and 380,000 aircraft movements in 2020.

Other major nearby commercial airports include: LA/Ontario International Airport (serves the Inland Empire); Hollywood Burbank Airport (serves the San Fernando and San Gabriel Valleys); Long Beach Airport (serves the Long Beach/Harbor area); and John Wayne Airport (serves the Orange County area).

The world's busiest general-aviation airport is also located in Los Angeles, Van Nuys Airport. Santa Monica Airport is also located near Los Angeles.

=== Intercity train services ===
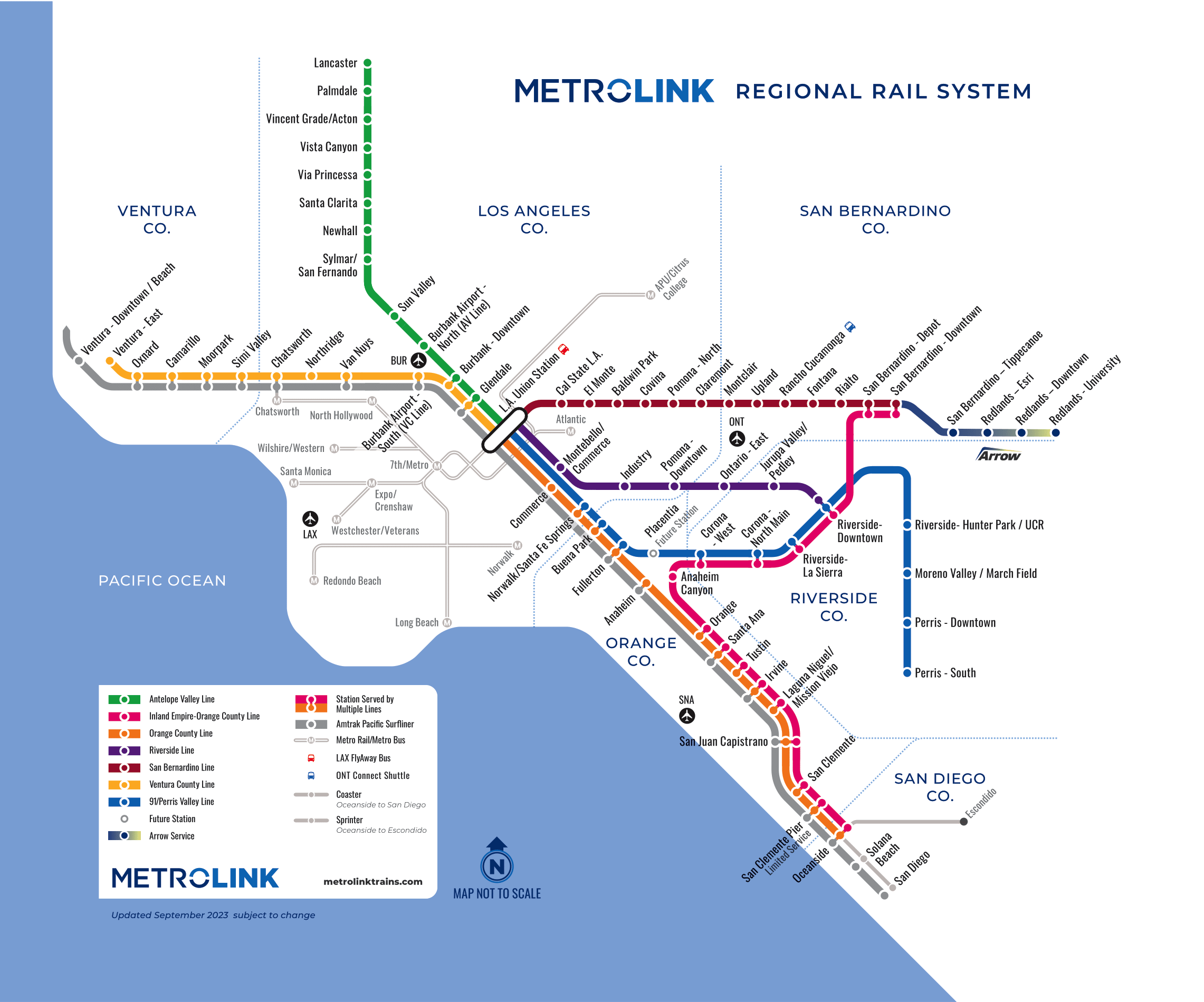
Metrolink passenger rail map, which stretches from Lancaster to Oceanside, with Union Station as the central hub

Union Station is the major regional train station for Amtrak, Metrolink and Metro Rail. The station is Amtrak's fifth busiest station, having 1.4 million Amtrak boardings and de-boardings in 2019. Amtrak operates eleven daily round trips between San Diego and Los Angeles, five of which continue to Santa Barbara via the Pacific Surfliner, the only service that runs through Los Angeles multiple times daily. Two of those trips continue to San Luis Obispo, California. The Coast Starlight provides additional service on the route and beyond to the San Francisco Bay Area, Sacramento, and on to Seattle, Washington. Amtrak motor coaches connect from Los Angeles to the Gold Runner route in Bakersfield with frequent service through the Central Valley of California to Sacramento and Oakland, and eastward to San Bernardino and Las Vegas.

There is also daily service to Chicago, Illinois on the Southwest Chief, and three times a week to New Orleans, Louisiana on the Sunset Limited. Due to the effects from Hurricane Katrina, Sunset Limited service between New Orleans to Jacksonville, Florida has been discontinued, although Amtrak is required by current federal law to develop a plan to reinstate the service. The Texas Eagle is a second train to Chicago, which operates thrice weekly. Sunset Limited and Texas Eagle trains operate as one train between Los Angeles and San Antonio, Texas before splitting off towards their respective destinations.

Amtrak Pacific Surfliner trains stop at several locations in Los Angeles County, including: Glendale, Bob Hope Airport in Burbank, Chatsworth, and Van Nuys.

Due to the large volumes of import freight that flow into the city's port complex, Los Angeles is a major freight railroad hub. Freight is hauled by Union Pacific Railroad and BNSF Railway. The now-defunct Southern Pacific Railroad once served the Los Angeles area before merging with Union Pacific. The Alameda Corridor, a below-grade rail corridor connects the port to the city's main rail yards and to points further north and east.

The California High-Speed Rail plans to connect Los Angeles to San Francisco and San Diego via the Inland Empire. Additionally, the Brightline West will serve Los Angeles to Las Vegas via Rancho Cucamonga.

=== Intercity freeway ===
The major freeway routes providing intercity connections are Interstate 5 (which goes north to Sacramento and south to San Diego), U.S. Route 101 (which goes north to Santa Barbara and San Francisco), and Interstate 10 (which goes west to Santa Monica and east to Phoenix, Arizona).

=== Intercity bus services ===
Greyhound, FlixBus, and various smaller bus lines provide intercity bus services. Greyhound connects directly to Bakersfield and from there into the California Central Valley, San Diego, Las Vegas, and the San Francisco Bay area. It departs from Los Angeles Union Station and from a secondary terminal located close to the North Hollywood Metro station.

=== Harbors ===
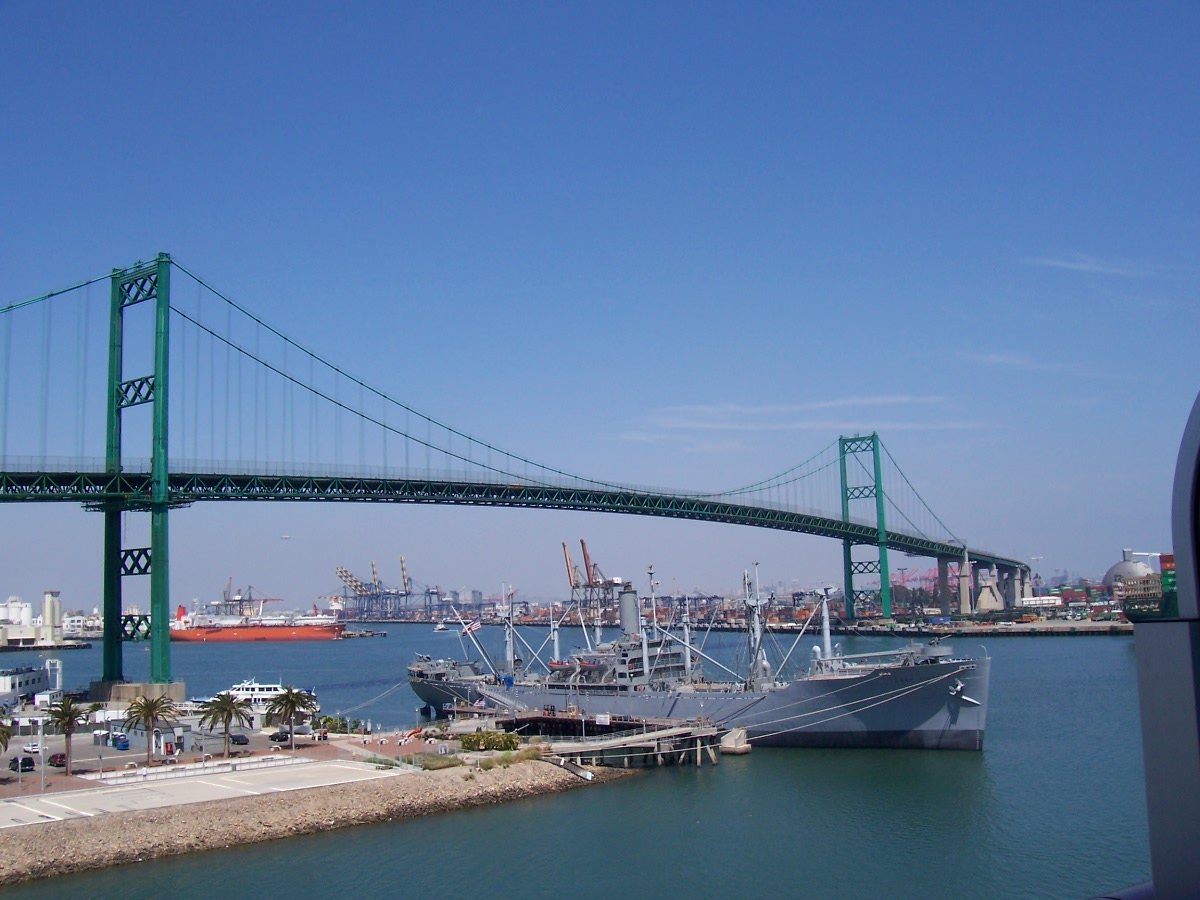
A view of the Vincent Thomas Bridge reaching Terminal Island

The Port of Los Angeles is located in San Pedro Bay in the San Pedro neighborhood, approximately 20 miles (30 km) south of Downtown. Also called Los Angeles Harbor and WORLDPORT L.A., the port complex occupies 7,500 acres (30 km^{2}) of land and water along 43 miles (69 km) of waterfront. It adjoins the separate Port of Long Beach. There are also smaller, non-industrial harbors along L.A.'s coastline. Most of these like Redondo Beach and Marina del Rey are used primarily by sailboats and yachts.

The Port of Los Angeles and Port of Long Beach comprise the largest seaport complex in the United States and the fifth busiest in the world. Over 11 percent of United States international trade (by value) passes through the Los Angeles region, and the Los Angeles customs district collects over 37 percent of the nation’s import duties.

The port includes four bridges: the Vincent Thomas Bridge, Henry Ford Bridge, Gerald Desmond Bridge, and Commodore Schuyler F. Heim Bridge.

=== Ferry services ===
Catalina Express offers passenger ferry service from San Pedro to the communities of Avalon and Two Harbors on Santa Catalina Island; they are mainly used for day excursions and to move supplies. There is however no regular vehicle ferry service to the island since the use of cars and trucks there are restricted.

== Intracity ==
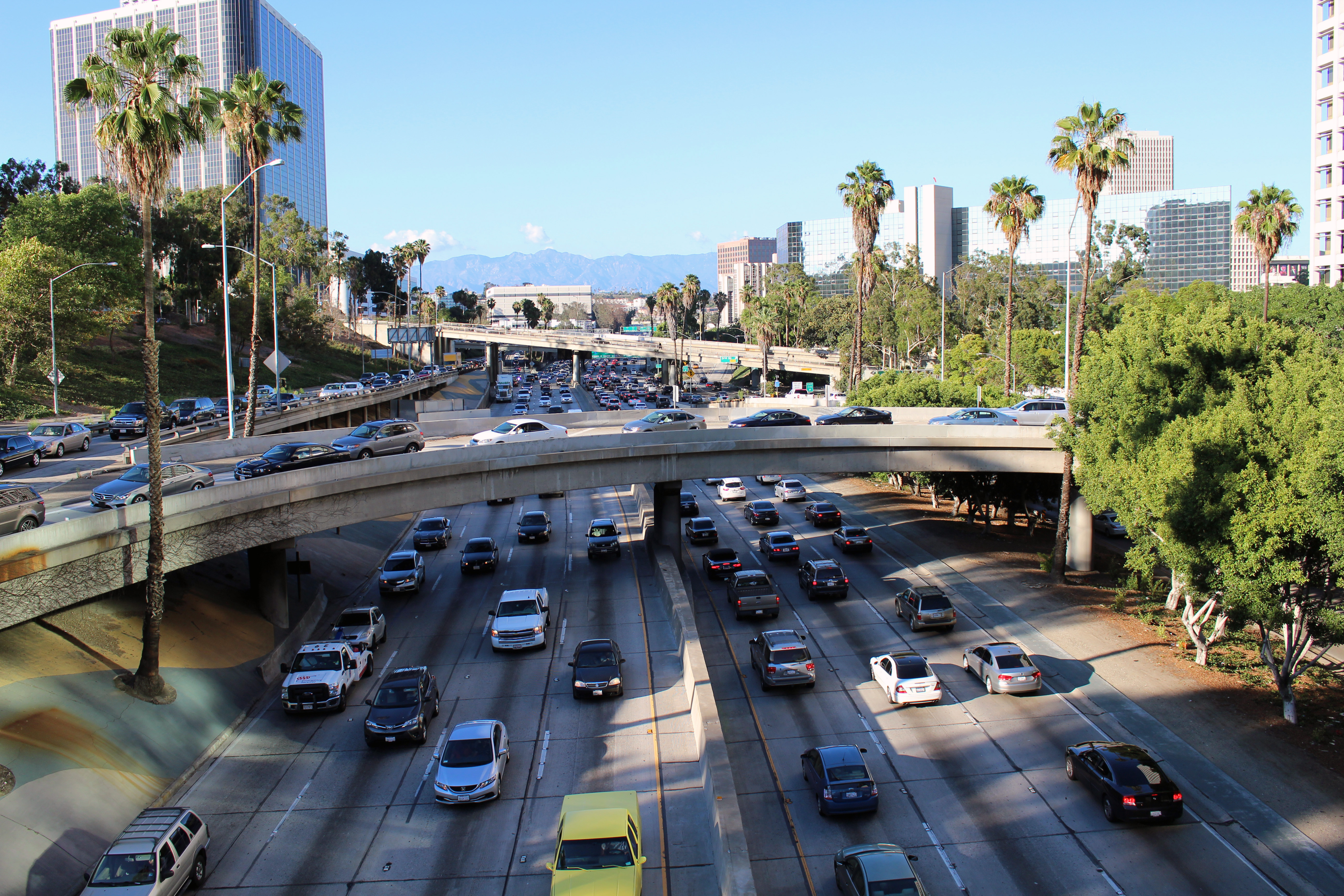
Rush hour on the Harbor Freeway in downtown Los Angeles

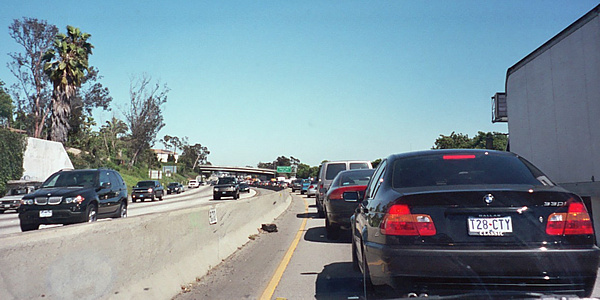
In a traffic jam on the Santa Monica Freeway, near the Robertson Boulevard exit

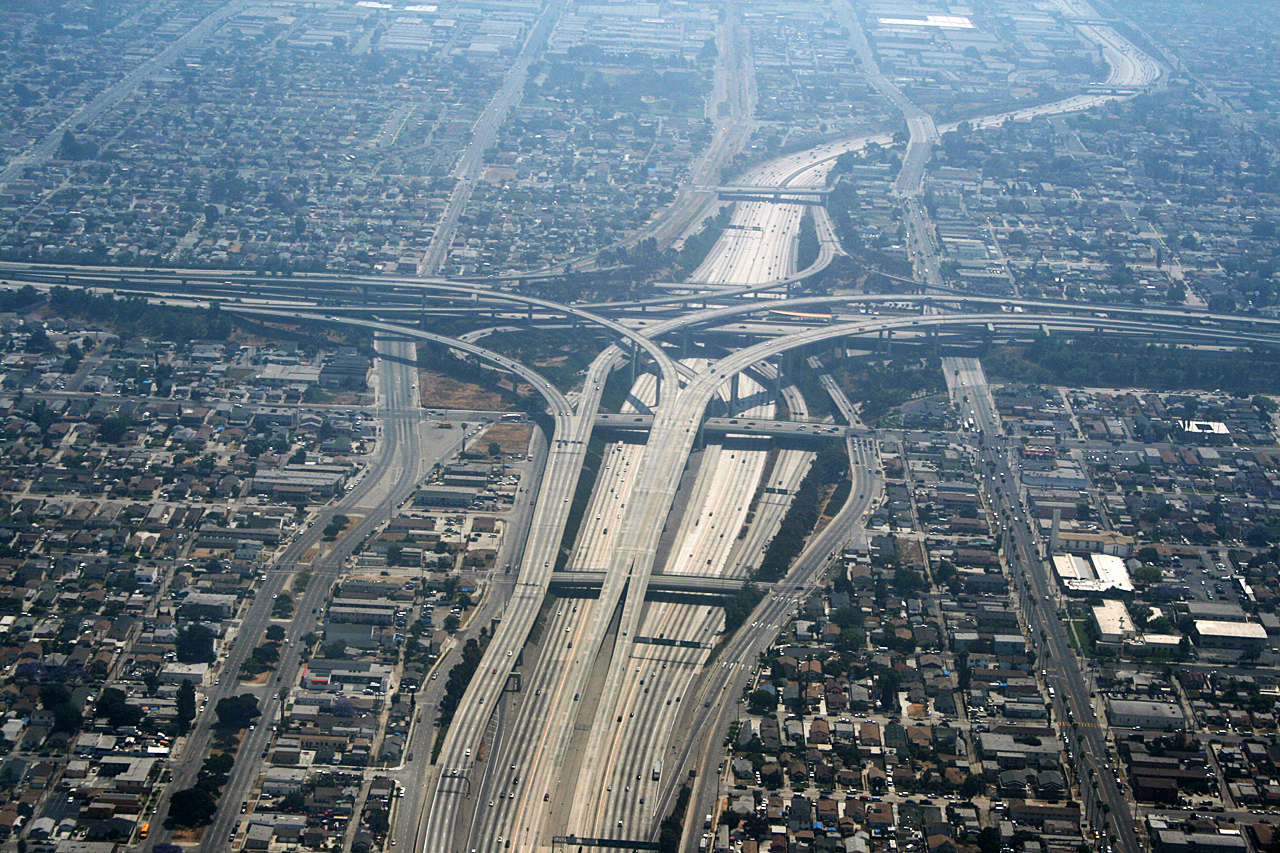
The Judge Harry Pregerson Interchange, connecting the Century Freeway (I-105) and the Harbor Freeway (I-110)

=== Freeways ===
There are a dozen major freeways that crisscross the region. California's first freeway was the Arroyo Seco Parkway segment of California State Route 110, also known as the Pasadena Freeway. It opened on January 1, 1940 and links downtown Los Angeles to downtown Pasadena. From Chavez Ravine north to Pasadena it can be quite dangerous because there is no shoulder, the lanes are narrow, the turns are sharp (not always properly banked), and the ramps are quite short and offer little room for acceleration to freeway speed. The route is often described as a hybridization of older parkway designs and more modern freeway designs. Commercial vehicles over 6,000 pounds (2.7 t; 2.7 long tons) are prohibited from using this freeway. Newer freeways are straighter, wider, and allow for higher speeds.

Major freeways in Los Angeles include:

- Glendale Freeway
- Santa Ana Freeway
- Golden State Freeway
- Santa Monica Freeway/San Bernardino Freeway
- Antelope Valley Freeway
- Seaside Freeway
- Pomona Freeway
- Marina Freeway
- Gardena Freeway
- Hollywood Freeway
- Ventura Freeway
- Terminal Island Freeway
- Glenn M. Anderson Freeway/Century Freeway
- Harbor Freeway
- Arroyo Seco Parkway
- Ronald Reagan Freeway
- Foothill Freeway
- San Diego Freeway
- Long Beach Freeway

Major highways in Los Angeles include:

- Pacific Coast Highway/Lincoln Boulevard
- Santa Monica Boulevard
- Decker Canyon Road
- Topanga Canyon Boulevard
- Alameda Street
- Slauson Avenue
- Highland Avenue
- Venice Boulevard

Angelenos are noted for referring to freeways with the definite article ("The 101"), in contrast to most other areas of the United States, who omit the article. Referring to freeways by name, for example "The San Diego Freeway", is essentially a holdover from the time when the freeways were built, and is diminishing. Freeways continue to be officially named; for example, State Route 118 was christened the Ronald Reagan Freeway.

=== Streets, street layout, the boulevards, and street problems ===
The city has an extensive street grid. Arterial streets (referred to as surface streets by locals, in contrast with freeways which are usually grade-separated roadways) connect freeways with smaller neighborhood streets, and are often used to bypass congested freeway routes. Consequently, most of the surface arterial streets in Los Angeles have various forms of congestion control.

Some of the more common means of maintaining surface street traffic flow is the use of loop-sensors embedded in the pavement allowing for intersection traffic signal timing adjustments to favor the more heavily delayed roadways; the use of a traffic control system allows for the synchronization of traffic signals to improve traffic flow (as of October 2009 this system is currently installed at 85% of the city's signalized intersections, more than any other US city); restrictions on vehicle turns on roadways without designated turning lanes during rush-hours; and the extensive use of rush-hour parking restrictions, allowing for an extra lane of travel in each direction during peak hours (weekdays excluding holidays generally from 7-9am thru 4-7pm, although hours vary by location) by eliminating on street parking and standing of vehicles, with violators being ticketed, and in the case of priority routes known as "anti-gridlock zones", immediately towed by specialized enforcement teams dubbed "tiger teams" at steep cost to the violator.

1st Street divides the block numbering grid north and south, and southwest of the Los Angeles River, Main Street divides the city east and west. Northeast of the river, block designations are divided east and west by Pasadena Avenue and North Figueroa Street.

From downtown Los Angeles to Long Beach, in a straight-down vertical pattern, east–west streets are numbered (starting with 1st Street in downtown, to 266th Street in Harbor City), and north–south streets are named. (1st Street is one block south of Temple.) There are many exceptions to the numbered streets, but the above pattern is generally used. This same numbered pattern is not mirrored north of Temple. Addresses are then numbered east or west stemming from Main Street (a major north south artery). Therefore, the landmark Watts Towers at 1765 E. 107th Street is approximately 107 streets south of 1st Street, and on the 17th street east of Main Street. Although the numbered streets are sequential, they do not necessarily equal the number of blocks south of 1st Street, as there are streets such as 118th Street and then 118th Place.

Many of the numbered streets also continue into neighboring cities, but some cities, such as Manhattan Beach, have made their own numbered street grid. Also, some districts of Los Angeles, such as Wilmington, San Pedro, Venice, and Playa Del Rey have their own numbered street grids.

Many arterials have been labeled as boulevards, and many of those mentioned below have been immortalized in movies, music, and literature.

Major east–west routes include: Roscoe, Victory, Ventura, Hollywood, Sunset, Santa Monica, Beverly, Wilshire, Olympic, Pico, Venice, Washington, Adams, Jefferson, Exposition, Obama Boulevard, and Martin Luther King Jr (formerly Santa Barbara Avenue), and Century Boulevard. The major north–south routes include: Topanga Canyon, Crenshaw, Reseda, Lincoln, Sepulveda, Van Nuys, Westwood, Beverly Glen, San Vicente, Robertson, La Cienega, Laurel Canyon, Glendale, Avalon Boulevard, and Main Street.

There are many other famous L.A. streets which carry significant traffic but are not labeled as boulevards. Examples include: Broadway, Bundy Drive, Barrington Avenue, Centinela Avenue, Fountain Avenue, Mulholland Drive, Slauson Avenue, Pacific Coast Highway, Century Park East, Avenue of the Stars, Century Park West, Normandie Avenue, Highland Avenue, Melrose Avenue, Florence Avenue, Manchester Avenue, Vermont Avenue, La Brea Avenue, Fairfax Avenue, Western Avenue, Van Ness Avenue, Figueroa Street, Grand Avenue, Huntington Drive, Central Avenue, Alameda Street, and Imperial Highway. West Los Angeles has many streets named after states that run east and west. Somewhat confusingly, adjacent Santa Monica uses a few of the same state names for different streets of its own.

Potholes are a notorious problem in Los Angeles and frequently cause severe damage to all kinds of vehicles. In 2008, then-mayor Antonio Villaraigosa made "Operation Pothole" one of his top priorities for that year and pledged to fill 1 million potholes. Due to the city's poorly managed budget, the city's Bureau of Street Services had only a single dedicated pothole-repair truck to cover 275 miles (440 km) of streets. Many city streets, such as Wilshire Boulevard, were engineered when cars, trucks, and buses were much smaller, and desperately need to be torn up and rebuilt from scratch to handle the weight of today's larger vehicles.

Furthermore, due to its severe budget problems, Los Angeles is one of the few California cities that does not use raised pavement markers on its streets. Thus, Los Angeles drivers must be vigilant not only for potholes, but for other drivers drifting out of lanes due to the lack of tactile feedback normally provided by such markers.

=== On foot ===
In congruence with the assertion of a popular song that "nobody walks in L.A.", only 3.5% of Los Angeles residents commuted to work by walking in 2016 and Los Angeles residents walk for exercise at rates similar to those of other major U.S. cities.

Downtown Los Angeles has numerous public escalators and skyways, such as the Bunker Hill steps to facilitate pedestrian traffic in the traffic-laden and hilly terrain. Downtown Los Angeles is one of two neighborhoods in Los Angeles ranked as a "walker's paradise" (with walk scores 90 or above) by Walkscore. The other is Mid-City West, which encompasses the area of the city immediately south of West Hollywood and east of Beverly Hills.

Much of Los Angeles remains pedestrian unfriendly. A large percentage of sidewalks in the City of Los Angeles (43% or 4,600 miles (7,400 km) of the 10,600 total miles (17,100 km)) are in ill repair stemming from the City Council decision in 1973 to use the federal money they had to take over the responsibility from the adjacent property owners. Previously they had conformed to California law which puts the responsibility for repair of sidewalks on the property owners. As certain popular species of trees accelerated the damage caused by roots, the council failed to concurrently allocate funds for continuing city repairs of such sidewalks. Voters were unwilling to approve funding repairs with a tax or a bond measure. The city again began dedicating funds for sidewalk repairs in 2000 but defunded the program during the Great Recession. In 2015, the city agreed to a landmark legal settlement that would fix the backlog of broken sidewalks and make other improvements to help those with disabilities navigate the city. The biggest agreement of its kind in U.S. history would settle a lawsuit on behalf of people in wheelchairs or others with mobility impairments who argued that crumbling, impassable sidewalks and other barriers were a violation of the Americans With Disabilities Act since they were prevented from accessing public pathways. In 2024, Mayor Karen Bass signed an executive directive designating a single committee tasked with coordinating the maintenance, delivery and development of street projects. Made up of general managers from nine city divisions, it will coordinate the work of the different departments and bureaus that deal with the concrete, asphalt, street lighting, bike lanes, storm water drains and parks.

=== Bicycle travel ===
Bicycling accounts for approximately 1% of Los Angeles commuting and has almost doubled in the last ten years. People in Los Angeles commute to work by bicycle about twice as frequently as the US average There are extended stretches of bicycle paths such as the Los Angeles River bicycle path, which runs from Burbank to Long Beach, with only a brief hiatus through downtown.

=== Mass transit ===
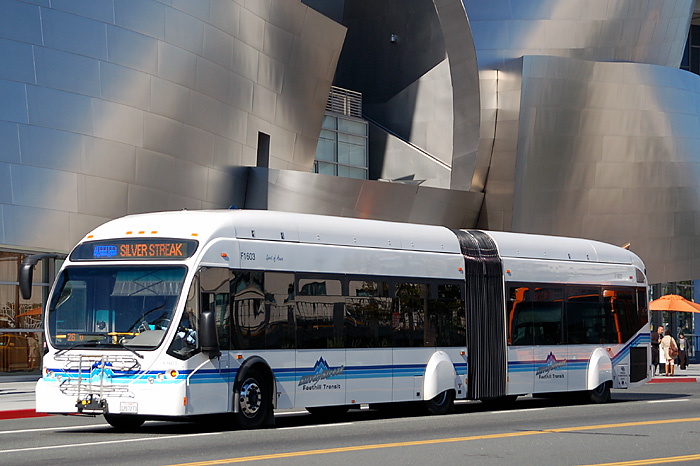
Foothill Transit Silver Streak bus in front of the Walt Disney Concert Hall in Downtown Los Angeles

The primary regional public transportation agency is Los Angeles Metro. The agency, which operates bus, light rail and subway services, averages 767,000 transit trips per weekday. It is the third largest transit agency in the United States. Other municipal transportation agencies in Los Angeles County (LADOT, Long Beach Transit, Montebello Bus Lines, Norwalk Transit, Redondo Beach, Santa Monica's Big Blue Bus, Santa Clarita Transit, Torrance Transit and Foothill Transit) have an additional 405,000 average weekday boardings.

In February 2008, Metro introduced the TAP card universal fare system. The TAP card allows bus and rail passengers to tap their cards on the farebox for faster boarding. TAP readers are installed on bus fareboxes and on turnstiles and standalone validators at rail stations. Because not all Metro Rail stations have turnstiles, it operates on a proof-of-payment system: as such, Metro's fare inspectors randomly check to make sure TAP users have validated their card by using a wireless handheld unit. TAP is now accepted on a number of different transit systems in Los Angeles County.

==== Buses ====
The extensive bus system operated by LACMTA includes the Metro Local, Metro Rapid, and formerly Metro Express services. Local buses tend to be orange, rapid buses red, and express buses blue. Rapid bus route numbers usually begin with a 7 and express bus numbers begin with 4 and 5. The buses have an estimated 1.3 million boardings on the weekdays. Including other municipal bus operators, Los Angeles County averages 1.7 million bus boardings per weekday, accounting for approximately 5.9% of the 29 million daily trips originating in Los Angeles County.

LACMTA has two bus rapid transit lines: the G Line and the J Line.

The G Line runs from Chatsworth station to North Hollywood station and began operations on October 29, 2005 as the Orange Line. For the entirety of its 17.7-mile (28.5 km) length, the 60-foot (18 m) articulated buses, built by North American Bus Industries and dubbed Metro Liners, operate on bus-only lanes that follow an old railroad right-of-way. Portions of the route parallel Chandler and Victory Boulevards, and Oxnard Street.

The J Line runs 38 miles (61 km) along Interstate 10 and Interstate 110 between El Monte and downtown San Pedro.

Foothill Transit also operates a bus rapid transit system called the Silver Streak, which runs from Montclair to Downtown Los Angeles along the El Monte Busway on Interstate 10.

Other local bus systems include:

- Culver CityBus - green (local) and grey (rapid)
- Santa Monica's Big Blue Bus
- Montebello Bus Lines
- Numerous other municipal bus systems

==== Metro Rail ====
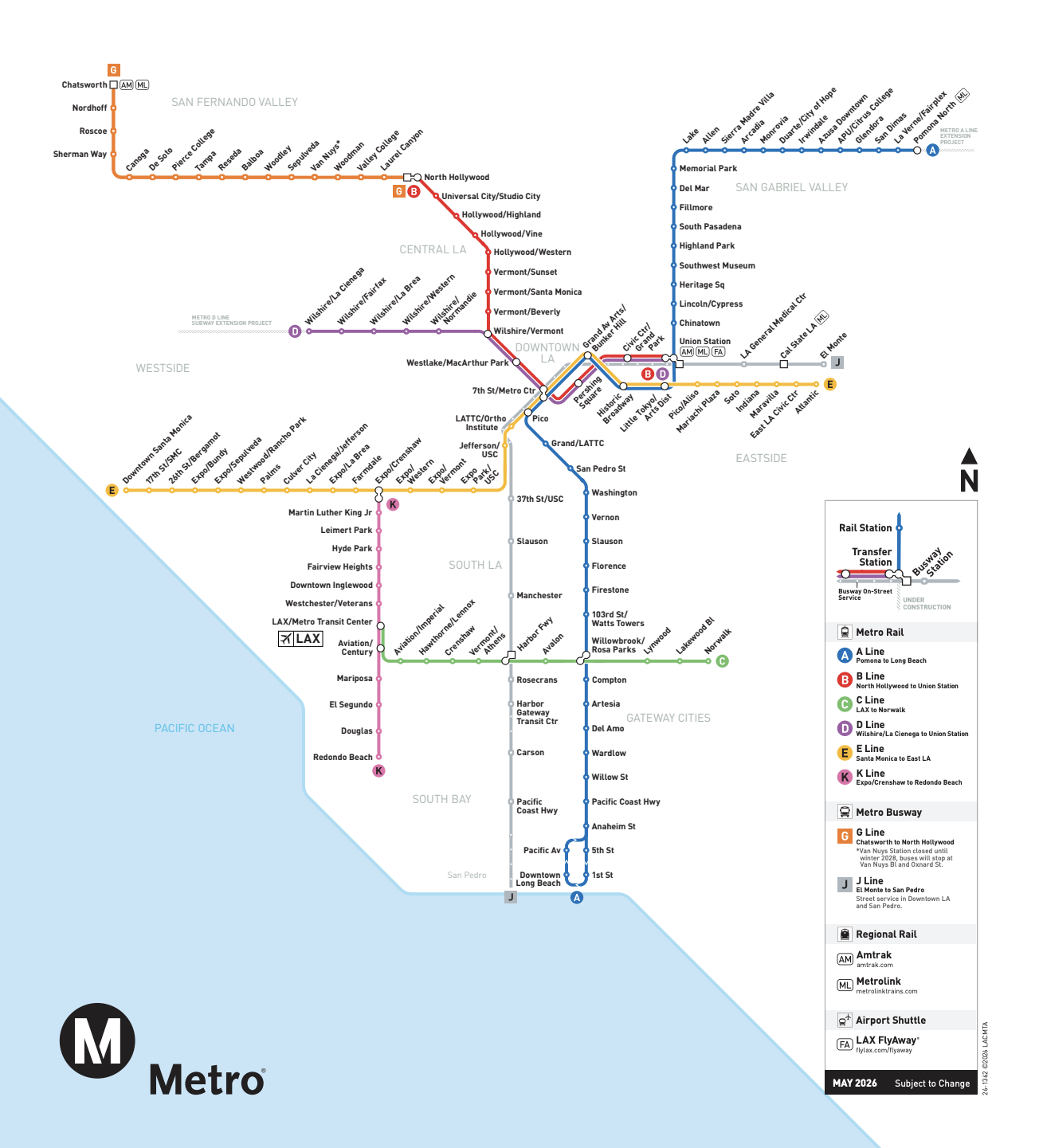
Map of Metro rail, subway, and BRT systems.

Between its light rail and heavy rail systems, Metro Rail has 107.4 miles (172.8 km) of rail, averaging 308,653 trips per weekday, and accounting for approximately 1.1% of the 29 million daily trips originating in Los Angeles County. The network includes four above-ground light rail lines (the A, C, E, and K lines) and one underground subway with two branches (the B and D lines). The Los Angeles Metro Rail ranked by daily ridership as the ninth-busiest rapid transit system in the United States. Ranked by passengers per route mile, however, the system ranks sixth, transporting 8,846 passengers per route mile, more than San Francisco's Bay Area Rapid Transit or the Chicago "L".

The Los Angeles Metro Rail system connects areas across the county, including Long Beach, Pasadena, Norwalk, El Segundo, North Hollywood, Inglewood and Downtown Los Angeles. As of 2023, four additional rail expansion projects are under construction, and various other projects are under study. The timing of their construction will depend on the availability of funding. These projects include:

- A connection of the C and K lines to LAX through a people mover (under construction).
- A westward extension of the D Line subway to Westwood near UCLA (under construction).
- A further extension of the A Line from Pomona to Clairmont, named the Foothill Extension.
- A further extension of the E Line from East Los Angeles to Whittier, Phase 2 of the Eastside Transit Corridor (final study stages).
- The new East San Fernando Valley Light Rail Transit Project in the San Fernando Valley is set to start construction in 2023.
- A K Line Extension to Torrance is under study, the southern terminus located in the South Bay area.
- A new LRT line through the Gateway Cities is under study, named the Southeast Gateway Line from Downtown Los Angeles to Artesia.
- A new HRT subway line corridor has started study from the San Fernando Valley to UCLA and eventually LAX. The Sepulveda Transit Corridor.
- A northern extension of the K line from Crenshaw to West Hollywood and a connection to the Hollywood Bowl. Currently under study. Called the K Line Northern Extension.
- An eastern extension of the D line in Downtown Los Angeles with a single new station in the Arts District.
- A new BRT or HRT line on a north-to-south route along Vermont Avenue is currently under study.
- Metro plans to convert the BRT G Line into an LRT line.
- Metro also plans to begin a study of a BRT or LRT line from LAX to Santa Monica along Lincoln Boulevard.

==== Commuter rail ====
Also serving Los Angeles and several surrounding counties is Metrolink, a regional commuter rail service. Metrolink averages 42,600 trips per weekday, the busiest line being the San Bernardino line.

==== Los Angeles public transportation statistics ====
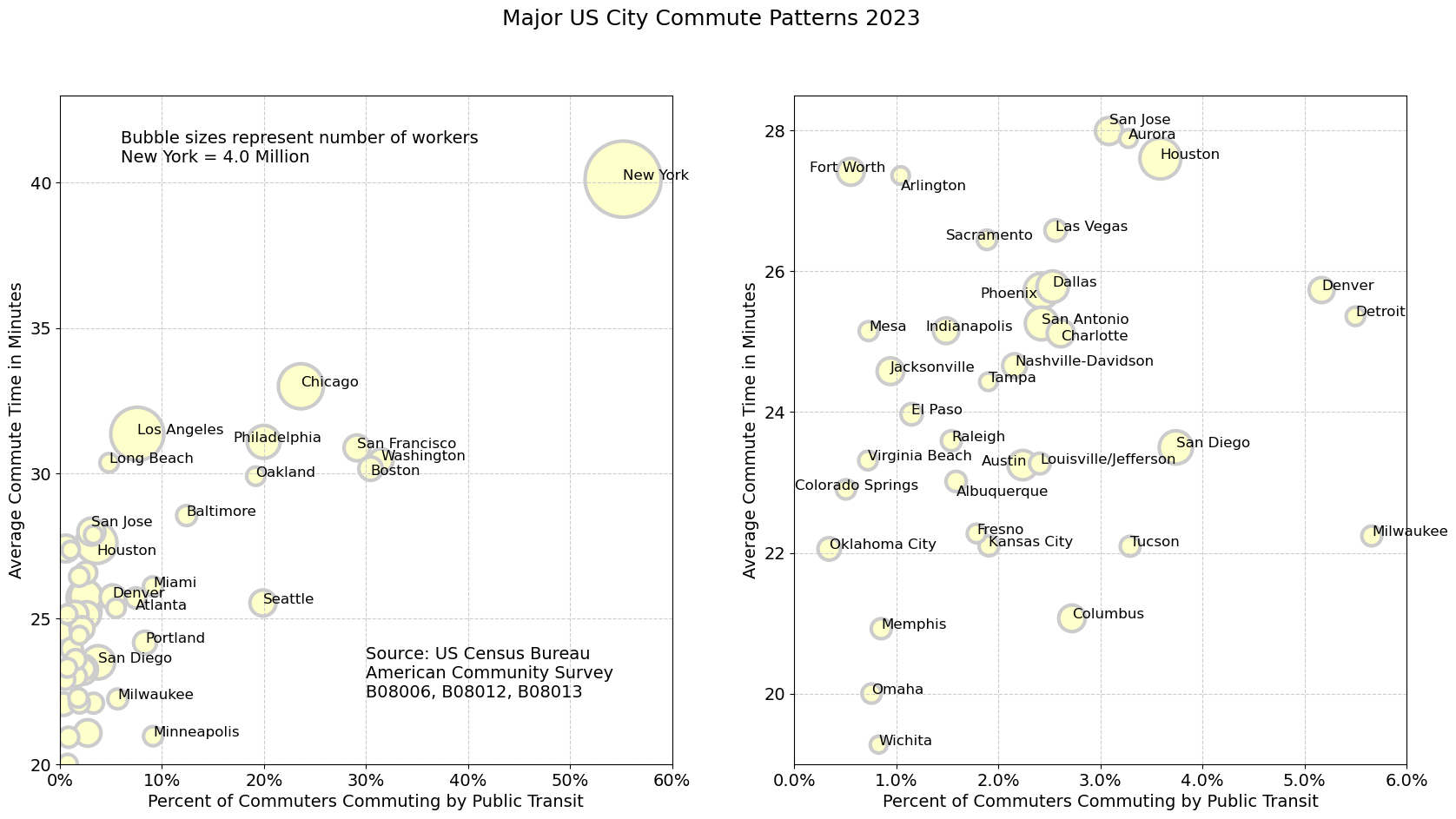
The percentage of workers using public transportation for their commute and the mean travel time for major cities in the United States, including Los Angeles, as of 2021

The city of Los Angeles has, a low rate of public transportation use compared to similar sized American cities, with only 7.7% of commuters getting to work by this means in 2021. The city's average one-way commute was approximately 29 minutes in 2021. 31% of public transit riders ride for more than 2 hours every day. The average amount of time people wait at a stop or station for public transit is 20 minutes, while 38% of riders wait for over 20 minutes on average every day. The average distance people usually ride in a single trip with public transit is 6.9 mi (11.1 km), while 30% travel for over 7.5 mi (12.1 km) in a single direction.

=== Vehicle for hire companies ===
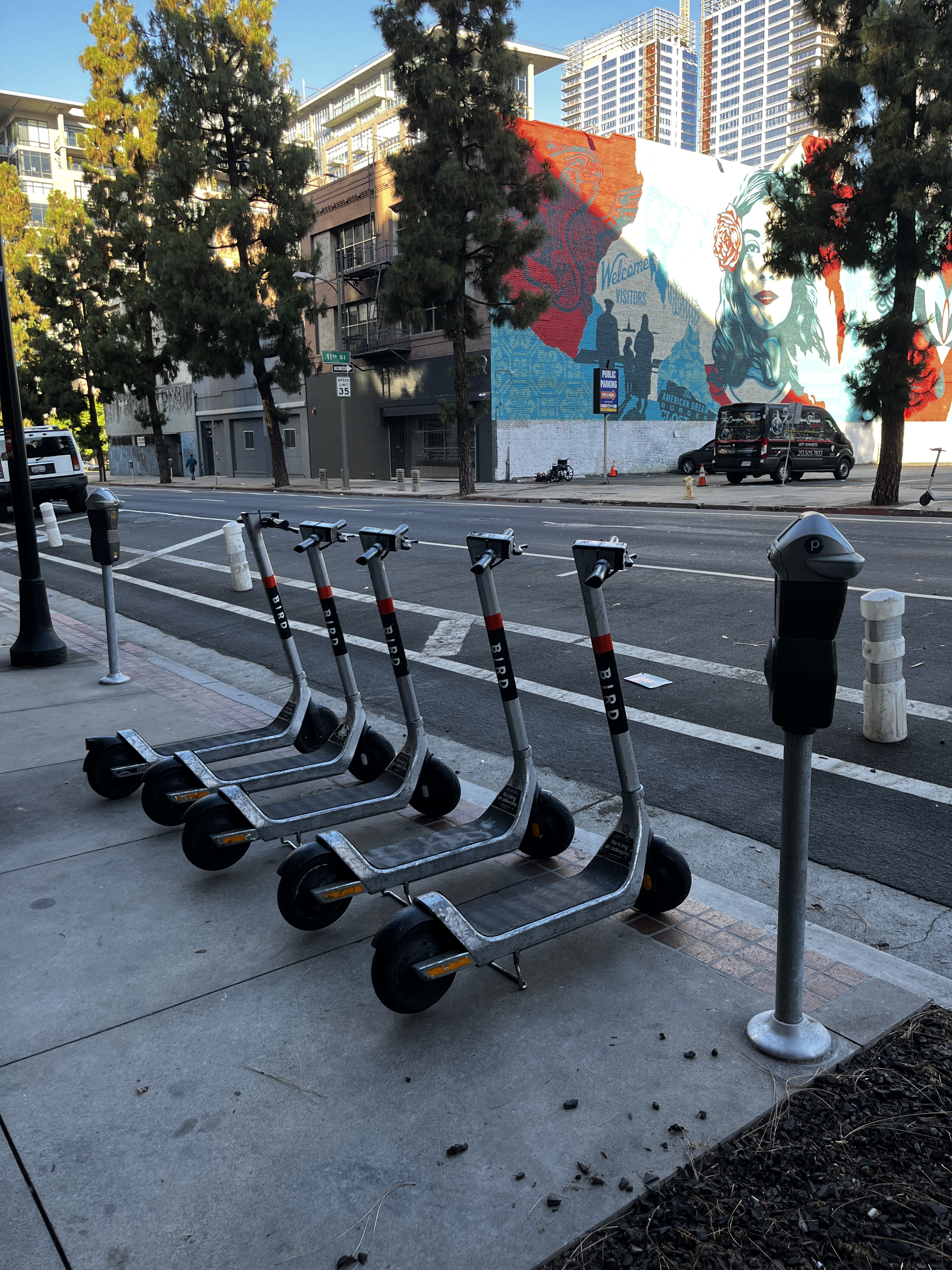
Bird E-scooter hire, Grand Avenue, 2022

Vehicle for hire companies face numerous regulations in California.

Taxis in Los Angeles are regulated by the Board of Taxicab Commissioners. There are 9 taxi companies in Los Angeles that operate more than 2,300 taxis. Some of the largest Taxi companies in Los Angeles are LA Yellow Cab, Bell Cab, and United Independent Taxi. RideYellow, Curb and Flywheel are three of the most popular mobile apps providing taxi service in Los Angeles.

Uber and Lyft operate in Los Angeles.

== Commuting ==
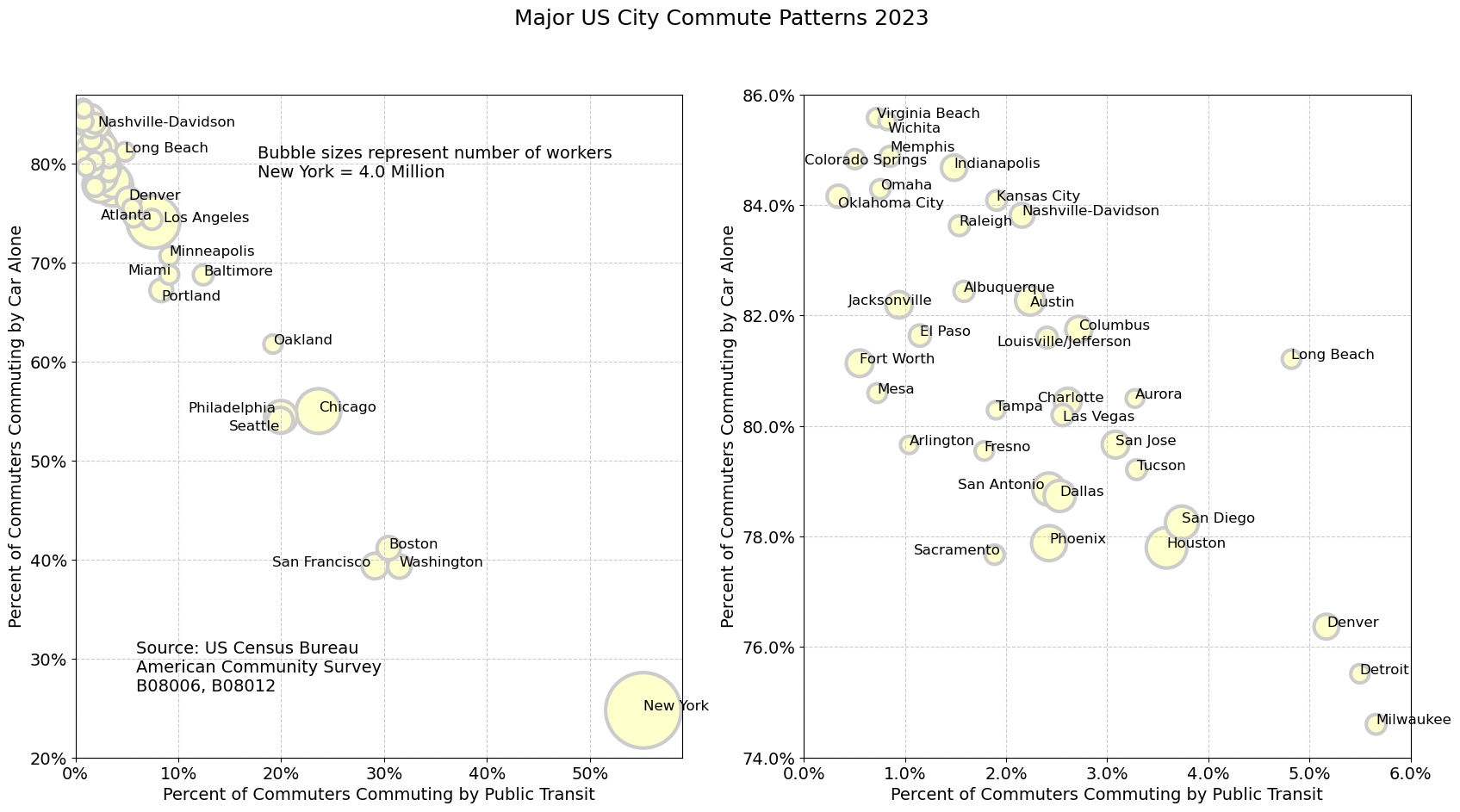
The percentage of workers using public transportation for their commute and the mean travel time for major cities in the United States, including Los Angeles, as of 2021

In 2021, of the 6.8 million workers who commuted in the Los Angeles-Long Beach metro area, 81.6% commuted to work driving alone, 10.9% commuted by driving in a carpool and 2.7% commuted on public transportation. In 2006, 64.9% of public transportation commuters were non-white, 70.2% were Hispanic and 67.6% were foreign born. 75.5% of public transportation commuters earned less than $25,000. However, only 32.7% of public transportation commuters had no vehicle available to them for their commute.

In the same year, for the City of Los Angeles, of the 1.4 million workers who commuted, 74.7% commuted to work driving alone, 10.7% commuted by driving in a carpool, 7.7% commuted by public transportation, and 3.5% walked. The percentage of population using public transport in Los Angeles is lower than other large U.S. cities such as San Francisco, Chicago and New York, but similar to or higher than other western U.S. cities such as Portland and Denver. 63.8% of public transportation commuters in the City of Los Angeles in 2006 were non-white, 75.1% were Hispanic and 73.9% were foreign born. 79.4% of public transportation commuters earned less than $25,000 and 37.6% had no vehicle available to them for their commute.

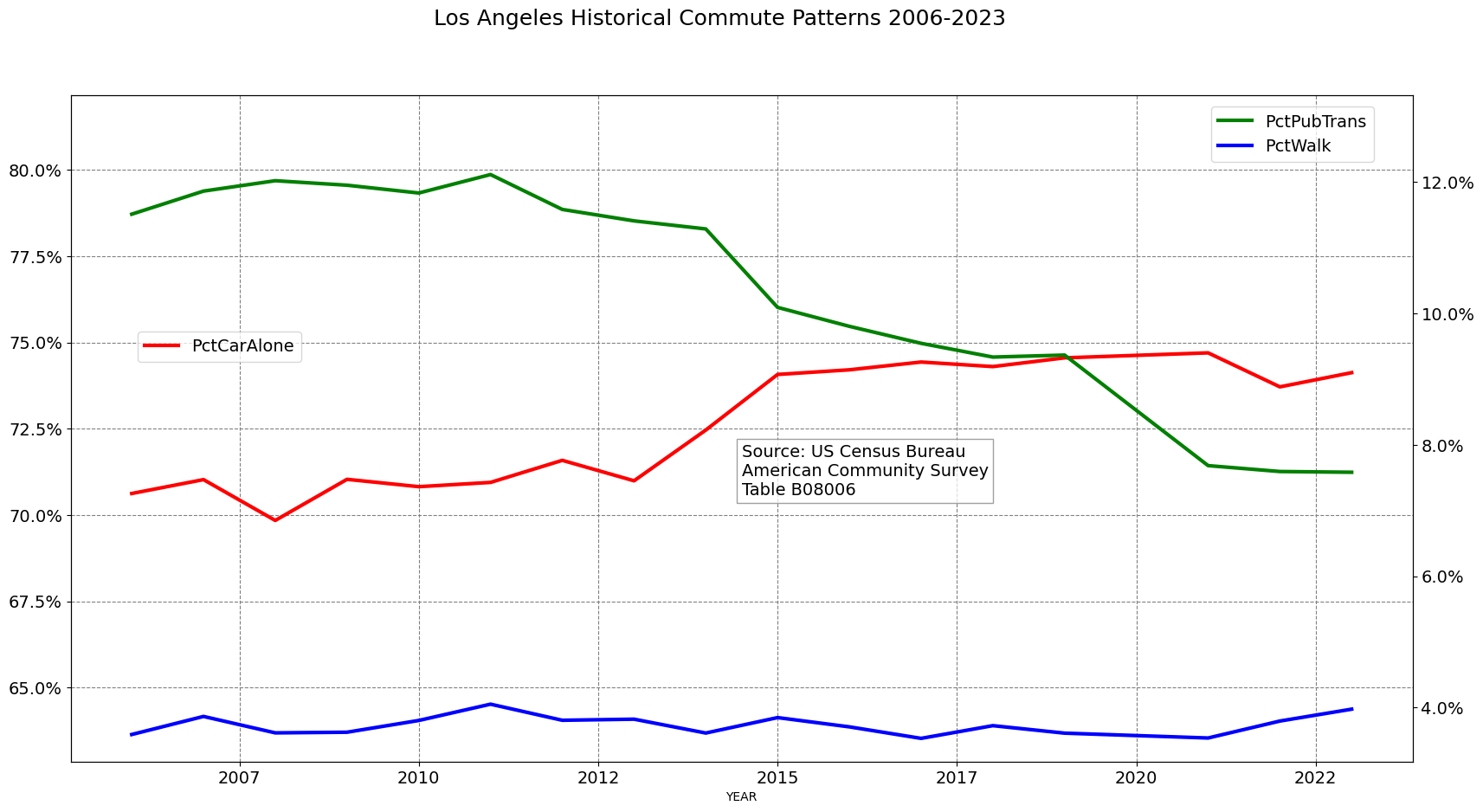
Historical Commute Patterns in the City of Los Angeles 2006-2023

Driving alone has increased at the expense of public transportation in recent years, with the most marked decline occurring between 2019 and 2021 due to commute pattern changes coincident with COVID-19. According to the American Community Survey, only 70.6% of workers who commuted in the City of Los Angeles did so by driving alone in 2006, and 11.5% used public transportation. The percent of workers commuting by public transportation had slowly fallen to 9.5% in 2019 before falling further to 7.7% in 2021. The number of commuters by public transit fell from 177,099 in 2019 to 106,300 in 2021, as the number of workers working from home increased from 130,409 to 432,722.

=== Rush hour ===
Los Angeles has synchronized its traffic lights. The mean travel time for commuters in Los Angeles is shorter than other major cities, including New York City, Philadelphia and Chicago. Los Angeles' mean travel time for work commutes in 2006 was 29.2 minutes, similar to those of San Francisco and Washington, DC. Rush hour occurs on weekdays between 5 am and 10 am, and in the afternoon between 3 pm and 7 pm (although rush-hour traffic can occasionally spill out to 11 am and start again from 2 pm until as late as 10 pm, especially on Fridays). Traffic can occur at almost any time, particularly before major holidays (including Thanksgiving, Christmas, and three-day weekends) and even on regular weekends when one otherwise would not expect it.

== Concerns ==
=== Air quality ===
Los Angeles is strongly predisposed to accumulation of smog, because of peculiarities of its geography and weather patterns. The millions of vehicles in the area combined with the additional effects of the Los Angeles/Long Beach complex frequently contribute to further air pollution. Los Angeles was one of the best known cities suffering from transportation smog for much of the 20th century, so much so that it was sometimes said that Los Angeles was a synonym for smog. In particular, the entire area in between Los Angeles Harbor and Riverside has become known as the "Diesel Death Zone".

The American Lung Association's 2023 State of the Air Report ranks the Los Angeles-Long Beach metro area as the most polluted in the United States for ozone. However, for year-round particulate matter, the metro area is outranked by three metro areas in the San Joaquin Valley, namely Bakersfield, Visalia and Fresno-Madera-Hanford. For short-term particulate matter, it is outranked by those same three metro areas as well as number of additional California metro areas such as San Jose-San Francisco-Oakland, as well as Fairbanks, Alaska.

=== Sidewalks ===
The city has about 9,300 miles (15,000 km) of sidewalk. Many are perilous or impassable due to lack of maintenance to those who have disabilities that affect their mobility. In 2015, the city committed to spending $1.4 billion over the next 30 years to resolve a class-action lawsuit citing violations of the Americans With Disabilities Act by fixing other barriers to full and safe access to city streets.

=== Vision Zero ===
Vision Zero is an initiative aimed at eliminating traffic-related fatalities. In Los Angeles County, an average of more than 75 people die each year in traffic collisions on unincorporated roadways. The County has developed an Action Plan to guide efforts to improve traffic safety in these communities.

== See also ==
- Cycling in Los Angeles
- Los Angeles Department of Transportation
- Freeway system of Los Angeles
- Asbury Rapid Transit System (1935-1958), small, privately owned bus system
- Great American Streetcar Scandal, conspiracy theory on demise of Red Car system
- History of Pacific Electric (Red Car)
- Plug-in electric vehicles in California § Los Angeles
