= Asbury Rapid Transit System =

Asbury Rapid Transit (1935–1958) was a small, privately owned bus system that existed in Los Angeles prior to the ascendancy of public transit agencies in the late 1950s.

This transit system was officially formed in 1939 out of the Original Stage Line (which had operated since 1913) and the Pasadena-Ocean Park Stage Line (which had operated since 1919). It acquired three additional companies in 1926. It operated bus routes primarily in San Fernando Valley and was acquired in 1954 by Metropolitan Coach Lines/Pacific Electric Railway.

In Russ Meyer's first film "The Immoral Mr. Teas", released in 1959, the eponymous hero waits at an Asbury Transit marked bus stop every day for his bus to work.
