= American Roll-on Roll-off Carrier =

American shipping line

American Roll-On Roll-Off Carrier
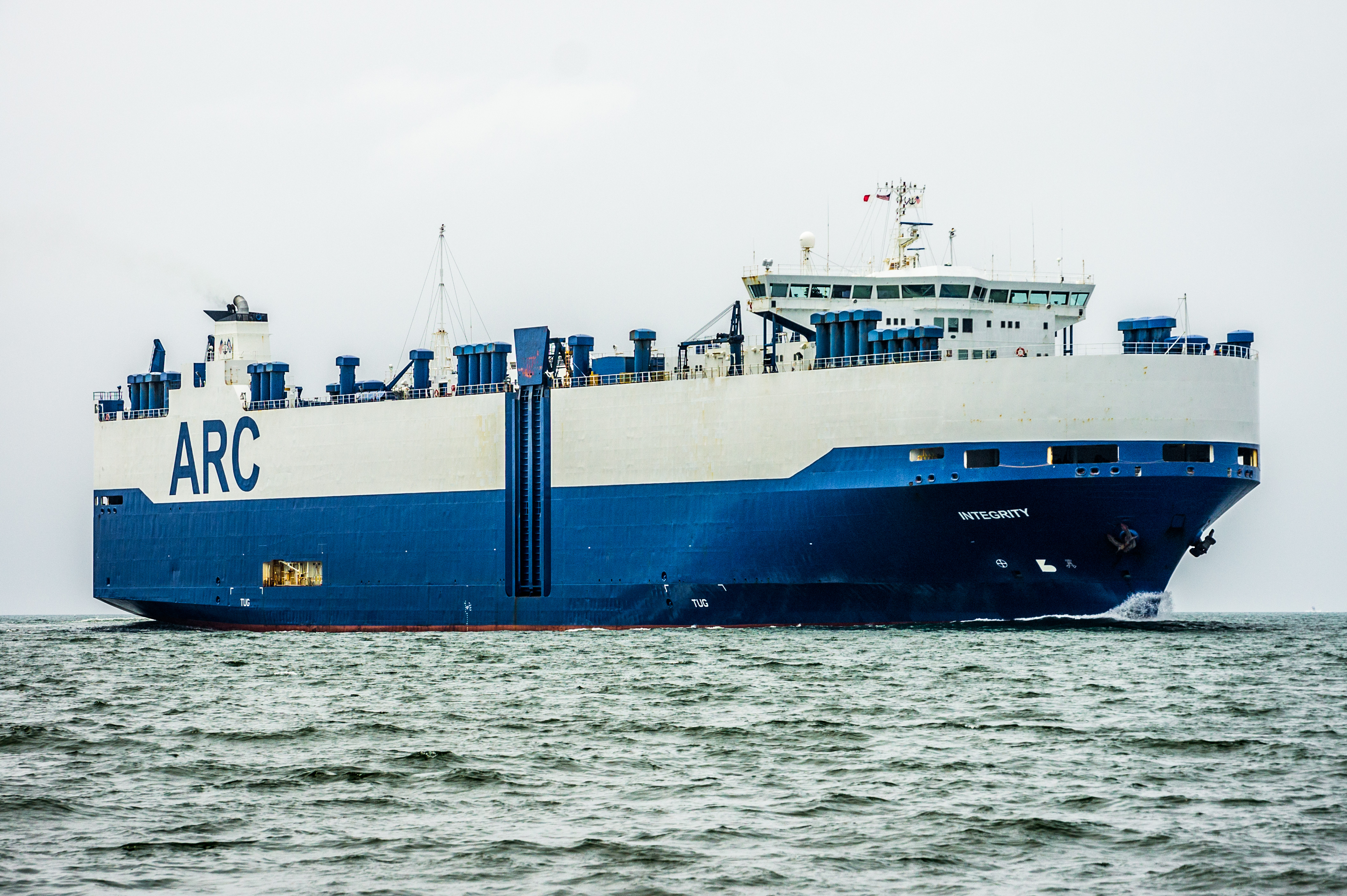
- Industry: Transport
- Founded: 1990
- Headquarters: Ponte Vedra Beach, Florida, U.S.
- Website: www.arcshipping.com

American Roll-On Roll-Off Carrier is an American shipping line specializing in roll-on/roll-off worldwide sea carriage, integrated global logistics, and data technology solutions. Since the 1990s, the company has expanded from primarily maritime shipping services to providing multimodal logistics and government services, including inland trucking, expeditionary support, stevedoring and terminal services, and household goods shipping.

== Overview ==
ARC is the largest US-flag roll-on/roll-off carrier, and one of the largest US-flag shipping lines operating in international trade.

The company was founded in 1990, and is presently headquartered in Ponte Vedra Beach, Florida and it is part of Wilh. Wilhelmsen group, along with Wallenius Wilhelmsen Logistics, EUKOR and United European Car Carriers.

The company specializes in maritime transport and distribution of cargo such as automobiles, trucks, trailers, Mafi roll trailers, heavy construction machineries and further types of rolling freight, including military vehicles.

ARC holds nine Maritime Security Program (MSP) contracts, the second-largest program participant, providing to the US armed forces from and to the US and Europe when the space on board is not utilized by commercial cargo. All of its vessels are also part of the Voluntary Intermodal Sealift Agreement (VISA), a jointly sponsored program by the US Maritime Administration and US Transportation Command.

By 2008, ARC was one of the three largest companies (alongside Maersk Line Limited and APL) providing the majority of liner transport capacity in the MSP fleet. These three firms handled most of the military shipments of containerized, breakbulk, and Ro-Ro cargo to the Middle East in support of Operations Enduring Freedom and Iraqi Freedom.

Since 2022, ARC has played a prominent role in transporting U.S. military cargo for NATO’s Operation Atlantic Resolve exercises in the wake of the Russian Invasion of Ukraine. Between August 2022 and July 2023, ARC moved approximately 32,000 pieces of military equipment across the Atlantic on behalf of the U.S. military, including Bradley Fighting Vehicles and HIMARS missile systems.

The main trade lanes are United States to Europe and Europe to the United States, specifically scheduling the Northern European ports of Antwerp, Bremerhaven, Southampton, and the US East coast ports of Baltimore, Charleston, Brunswick, Galveston.

== Fleet ==
The ARC fleet currently comprises ten ships all with United States flag.

Vessels in the ARC Fleet as of 02 August 2025
Name	IMO#	Built	Reflagged (USMM)	Tonnage	Length Overall	Beam	Cargo Capacity	Picture
MV Endurance (ex-Taronga)	9121273	1996	2010	72,708 GT	264.6m (868.1 ft)	32.26m (105.8 ft)	4,923 CEU	
MV ARC Resolve (ex-Otello)	9316141	2006	2019	61,260 GT	199m (653 ft)	32.26m (105.8 ft)	6,736 CEU	
MV Patriot (ex-Aida)	9316139	2006	2016	60,979 GT	199m (653 ft)	32.26m (105.8 ft)	6,736 CEU	
MV ARC Commitment (ex-Tiger)	9505039	2011	2021	74,255 GT	230.8m (757 ft)	32.26m (105.8 ft)	7,934 CEU	
MV Liberty (ex-Topeka)	9310109	2006	2017	61,321 GT	199.99m (656.1 ft)	32.26m (105.8 ft)	6,354 CEU	
MV ARC Independence (ex-Faust)	9332925	2007	2019	72,118 GT	227.8m (747 ft)	32.26m (105.8 ft)	7,620 CEU	
MV ARC Integrity (ex-Fedora)	9332949	2008	2019	72,118 GT	227.8m (747 ft)	32.26m (105.8 ft)	7,620 CEU	
MV ARC Honor (ex-Tulane)	9505089	2012	2024	72,295 GT	229.99m (754.6 ft)	32.26m (105.8 ft)	7,970 CEU	
MV ARC Defender (ex-Tomar)	9375264	2008	2022	61,328 GT	199.99m (656.1 ft)	32.26m (105.8 ft)	6,354 CEU	
MV ARC Endeavor (ex-Tugela)	9505065	2011	2024	72,295 GT	229.99m (754.6 ft)	32.26m (105.8 ft)	7,970 CEU	

The following pairs of vessels are sister ships: MV ARC Resolve and MV Patriot, MV ARC Independence and MV ARC Integrity, and MV ARC Honor and MV ARC Endeavor.

== Facts and accidents ==
On 2 June 2015, a fire started on board of ARC owned M/V Courage. The vessel was sailing from Bremerhaven to Southampton when the flames broke out in the cargo hold, damaging vehicles and structure. The crew was able to contain the fire while at anchor, about 40 nautical miles from Southampton.

On 24 February 2017, ARC owned M/V Honor faced an onboard fire in the English Channel while sailing in between the ports of Southampton and Baltimore. The fire was kept under control by the 21 Crew members and was extinguished before the Coast Guard and fire brigades reached the vessel. The ship was then requested to proceed back into Southampton harbour for further inspection.

On 8 August 2018, a fuel spill happened near Port Arthur, Texas due to the collision of ARC owned M/V Endurance against the Savage Pathfinder tugboat. 13,000 gallons of fuel were dispersed in the sea, however the spillage was secured and clean up started hours after the accident.

== See also ==
- EUKOR
- Nippon Yusen Kaisha
- Siem Shipping
- KESS - K Line Europe Short Sea
- United European Car Carriers
