= ARC Independence =

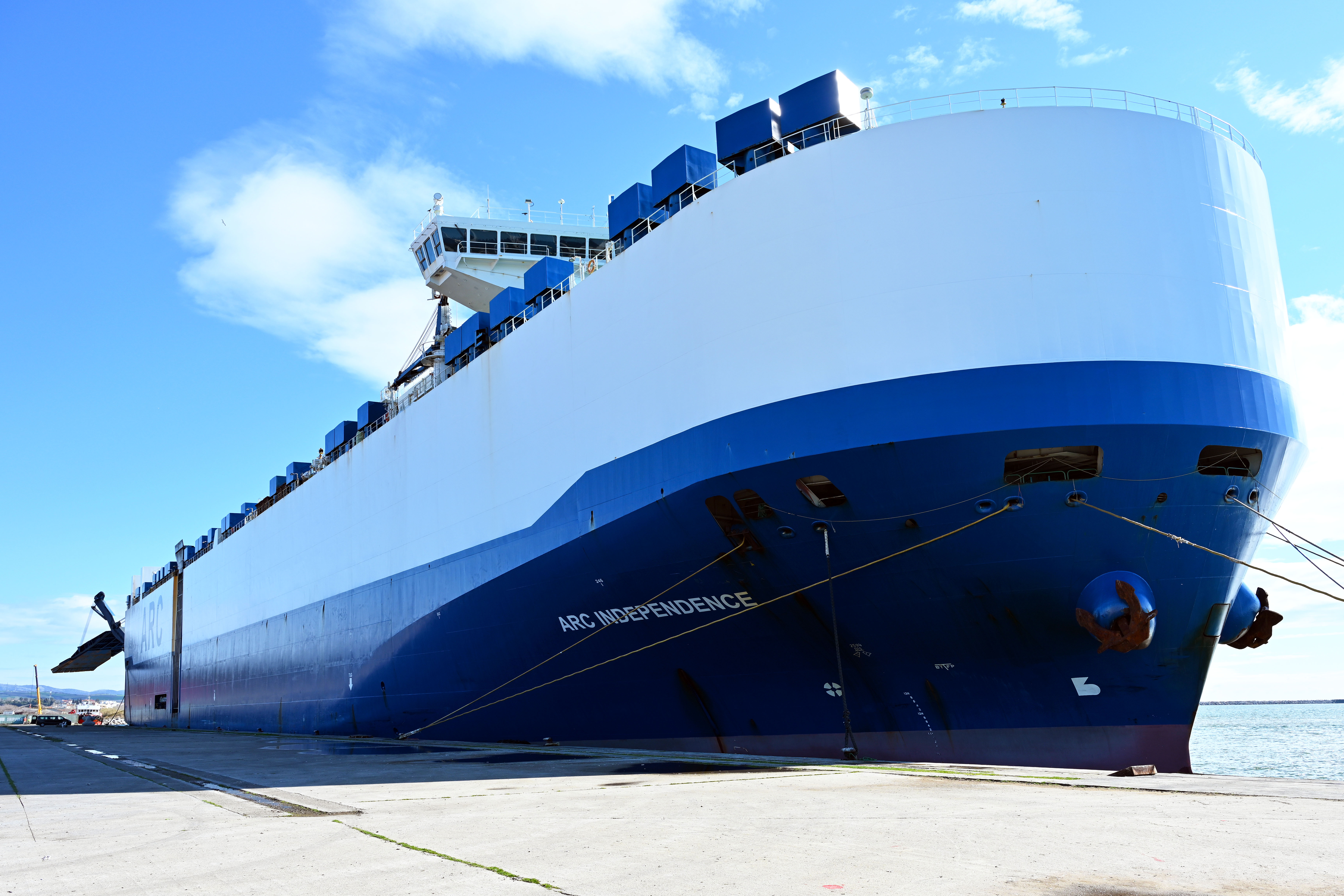
- ARC Independence at Alexandroupolis, Greece in March 2024

History
- Name: Faust
- Namesake: Faust
- Owner: Wallenius Lines
- Operator: Wallenius Wilhelmsen Logistics
- Port of registry: Sweden
- Builder: Daewoo Shipbuilding & Marine Engineering, South Korea
- Launched: 24 February 2007
- Completed: 2007
- Identification: IMO number: 9332925; Call sign: SLKQ; MMSI number: 266260000
- Status: In service

General characteristics
- Type: Car carrier
- Tonnage: 71,583 GT; 33,546 NT; 30,383 DWT
- Length: 227.8 m (747 ft 5 in)
- Beam: 32.26 m (105 ft 10 in)
- Height: 51.98 m (170 ft 6 in)
- Draft: 9.5 m (31 ft 2 in) (design); 11.3 m (37 ft 1 in) (maximum)
- Decks: 13; 5 movable
- Ramps: Stern quarter and side ramps
- Installed power: B&W 7S60MC-C
- Propulsion: Single shaft; fixed-pitch propeller
- Capacity: 8,000 cars (RT-43); 3,484 cars, 468 buses
- Crew: 15

ARC Independence, formerly Faust is a large ro-ro car carrier built in 2007 by Daewoo Shipbuilding & Marine Engineering for Wallenius Lines, Sweden. She sailed under the Swedish flag for just over twelve years, serving with Wallenius Wilhelmsen Logistics. In October 2019, she was re-flagged into the United States Merchant Marine under her current name, and is operated by American Roll-On Roll-Off Carrier (ARC). Her sister ship, ARC Integrity (ex-Fedora) was likewise re-flagged at the same time and continues to operate with ARC. They are among the largest car carriers in the world.

It is sometimes incorrectly reported that in 2004, this particular ex-MV Faust was renamed to MV Liberty. This is due to multiple vessels having carried the name Faust. The Faust which was renamed to Liberty was built by Oshima Shipbuilding in Japan and launched in 1985; at 660 feet in length and 52,000 gross tons, she was significantly smaller than the vessel which is now the ARC Independence.

Faust appeared in a 2008 episode of the Discovery Channel's documentary series Mighty Ships during a voyage between the UK and United States.
