= EUKOR =

Shipping company

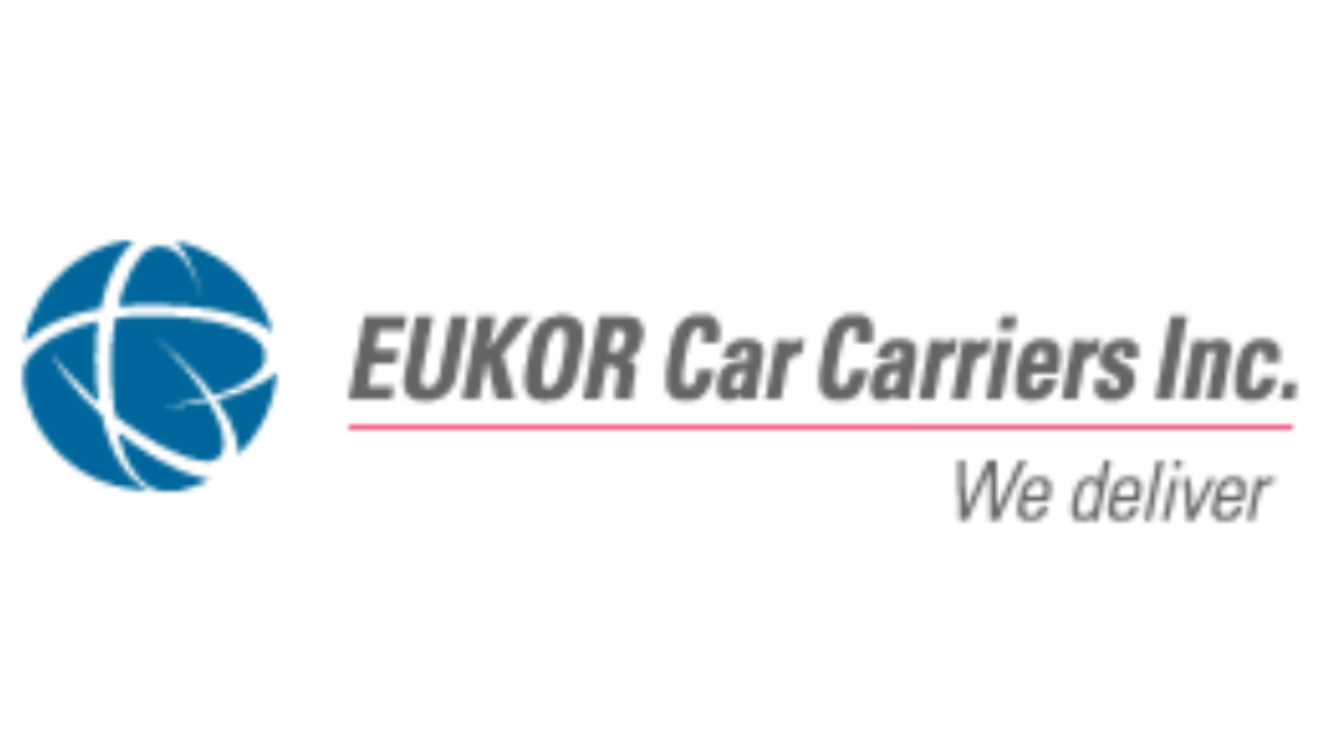

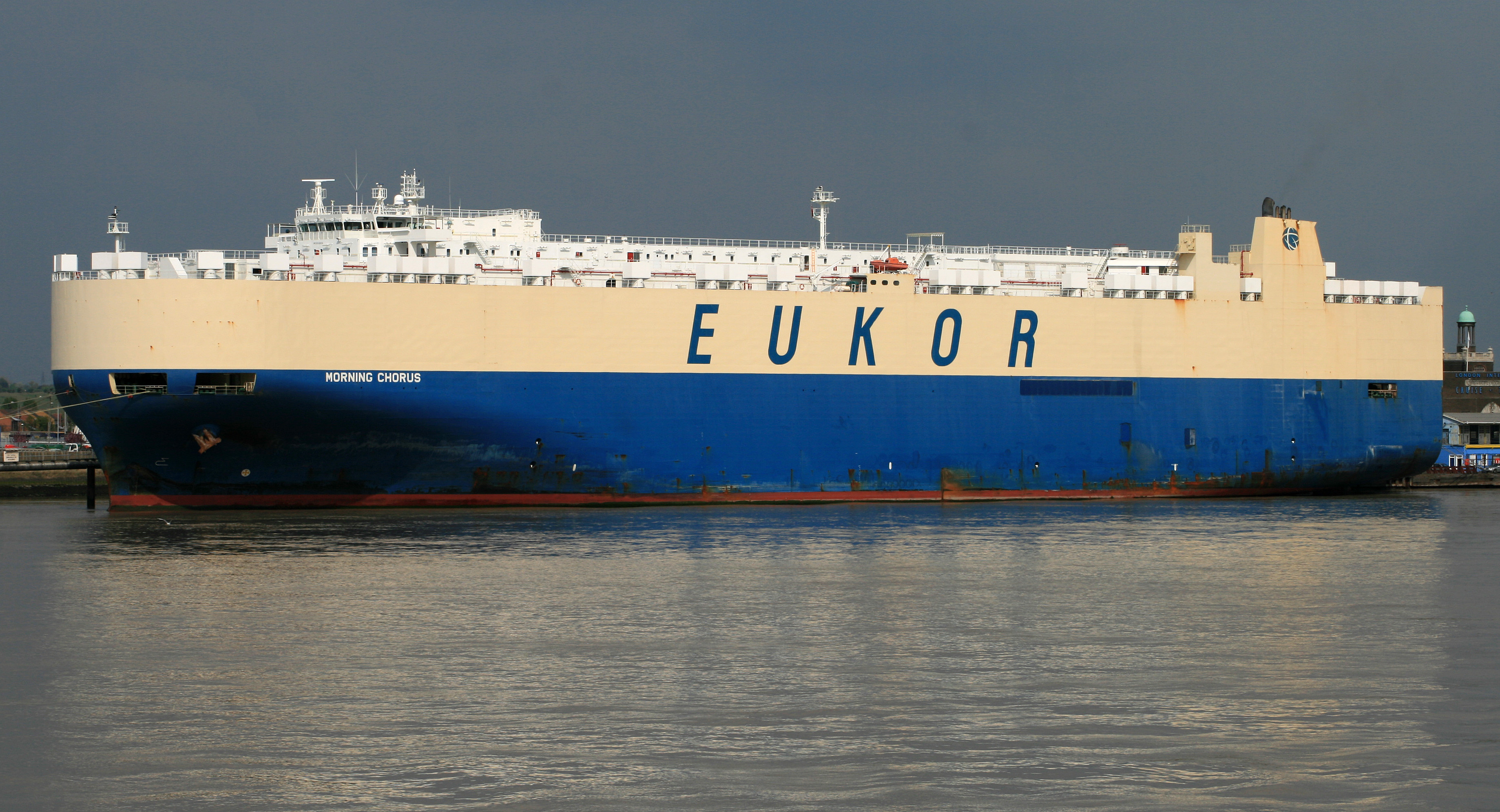
- Industry: Transport
- Founded: 2002
- Headquarters: Lotte World Tower, Seoul
- Number of employees: 480
- Website: www.eukor.com

EUKOR is a South Korean specialised Roll-on/roll-off shipping line. The company's specialize in the sea carriage of new and used cars and High & Heavy cargo.

The name of the brand EUKOR comes from a portmanteau that combines the words "Europe & Korea".

The company is owned by Wilh. Wilhelmsen along with Wallenius Lines, Wallenius Wilhelmsen Logistics, American Roll-on Roll-off Carrier, and United European Car Carriers.

== History ==
The company was established in the 1980 as the RORO-Car Carriers arm of Hyundai Merchant Marine. Its first car carrier vessel was purchased and named mv Hyundai No.1. In the following years, three shipping lanes to Europe, Australia, and India were opened.

In August 2002, Wilh. Wilhelmsen and Wallenius Lines each purchased 40% of the equity. Hyundai Motors and Kia split the remaining 20% equity stake. It was re-branded to EUKOR. The two Korean carmakers continued to ship their products exclusively through the new joint venture. In order to obtain antitrust approval from the European Commission, the parties agreed to terminate the WALLNYK collaboration with Nippon Yusen Kaisha and agreed not to enter into any similar agreements with any competing carrier on the routes in question, without prior Commission consent.

In 2015, China fined EUKOR 284 million yuan ($42.5 million) for engaging in a cartel. A similar fine was applied to its sister company WWL.

In April 2017, a new ownership structure was created under which Wallenius Wilhelmsen Logistics, EUKOR and American Roll-on Roll-off Carrier were merged. The new company will be called Wallenius Wilhelmsen Logistics ASA.

== Accidents ==
On May 24, 2004, the EUKOR operated vessel Hyundai No.105, sailing from South Korea to Germany, collided with a Japanese very large crude carrier (VLCC) close to Singapore Sentosa island in the Malacca Strait, one of the world's busiest sea passages. As a result the Hyundai No.105 sank with a total loss of over 3,000 brand new Hyundai/Kia cars and an additional 1,200 used Japanese cars stowed on board. The crew was rescued but the ship could not be salvaged.

On January 6, 2010, the British flagged mv Asian Glory, carrying about 2,400 cars, most of them new Hyundai and Kia models, was sailing from South Korea to Jeddah, Saudi Arabia when it was captured by Somali pirates in the Gulf of Aden. Asian Glory had a crew of 25, including 8 Bulgarians and 5 Indians, who were finally released in June 2010 following a ransom payment of an undisclosed amount that intelligence reports indicated was close to the $15 million that the pirates were demanding; allegedly, an amount similar to the ship's hull insurance cost and the value of the cargo on board.

On April 19, 2014, a fire started on mv Asian Empire off the coast of Japan, when the vessel was en route from Ulsan to Balboa, Panama. All 24 members of the crew had to be evacuated. A second fire broke out hours later; the reasons were investigated but remained unclear. Two salvage tugs had to be hired to tow the vessel to China for dry docking.

In 2016, Brazilian regulators raised a similar claim and required EUKOR to pay 15.9 million reais. In 2017, a further suit was brought by the U.S. Federal Maritime Commission for price fixing and conspiracy.

On February 21, 2017, the mv Morning Composer was hijacked by Libyan pirates off the coast of Misurata. The vessel was carrying 3,500 Korean brand new cars and 1,500 used vehicles. The crew of 12 Filipinos, 10 Bulgarians and 2 Ukrainians were unharmed and freed to restart the journey briefly after the Libyan military intervened on 22nd early morning.

On 28 May 2019, while alongside Ulsan port, a sudden fire broke out on a car deck of the EUKOR operated mv Platinum Ray. The immediate action of the crew and fire brigades could contain the fire and extinguish it within five hours, limiting the damage to only 69 cars of the over 2,000 stowed on board.

== Fleet ==
The company tonnage comprise 80 PCC-PCTC vessels transporting about 4 million cars annually, mainly from South Korea to the US and Europe.

The main business consists in the maritime transport and distribution of cargo such as automobiles, trucks, trailers, Mafi roll trailers, heavy construction machineries and further types of rolling freight.

Since 1999, when mv Asian Destiny was launched, the fleet started to include ships capable of carrying over 6,000 cars per voyage.

Over half of the fleet's vessels include the word "Morning" in the first part of their names. The tonnage name idea is linked to the fact that Korea started to be internationally referred as "the Land of Morning calm", and its ruling monarchy the Joseon, became known abroad as the "Morning Dynasty", when a book written in 1886 by Percival Lowell obtained large success in the United States in narrating the history of the country.

== See also ==
- American Roll-on Roll-off Carrier
- Wilh. Wilhelmsen
- Hyundai Glovis
- Nippon Yusen Kaisha
- Siem Shipping
- United European Car Carriers
- KESS - K Line Europe Short Sea
- MV Asian Glory

== Ships gallery ==
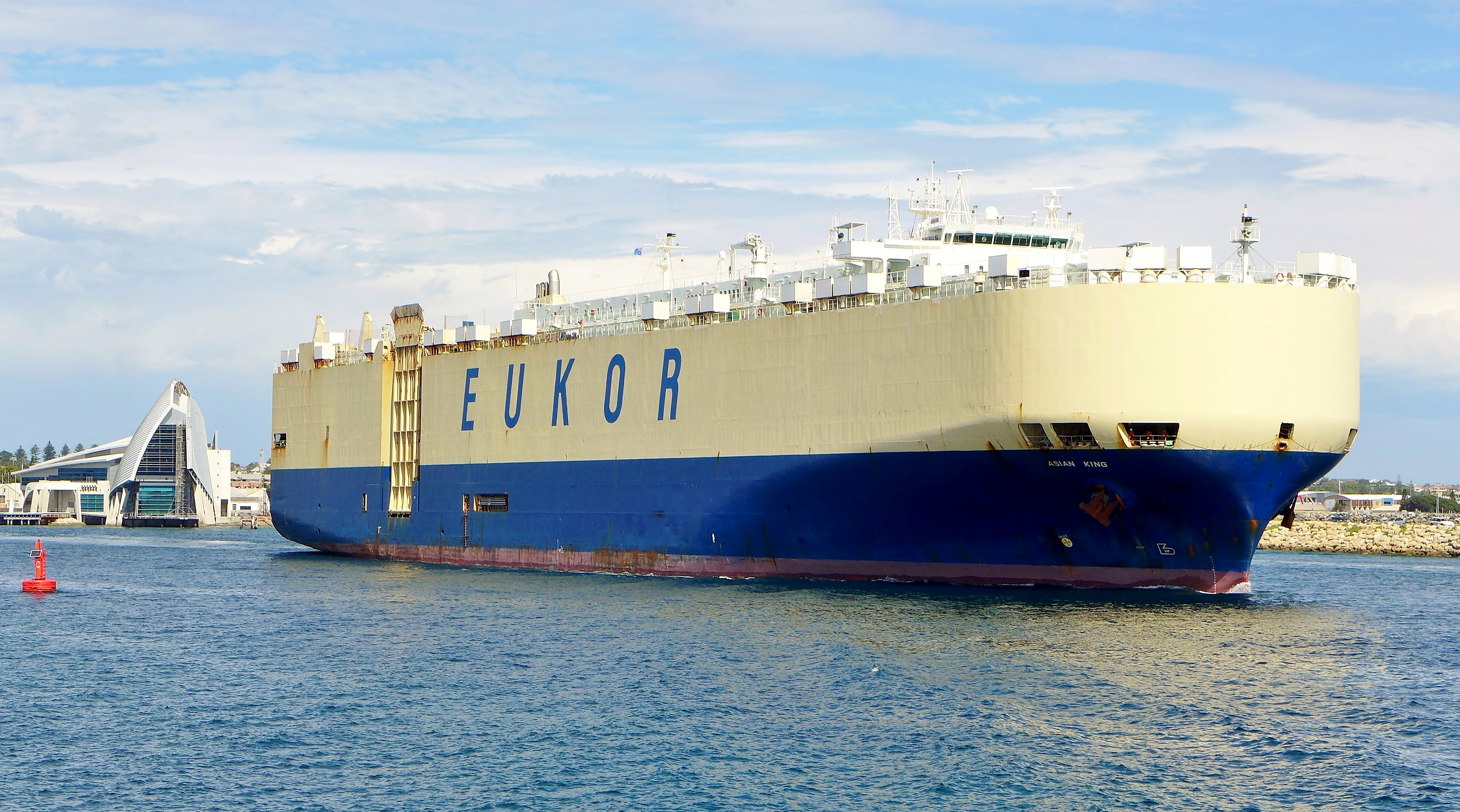
Asian King

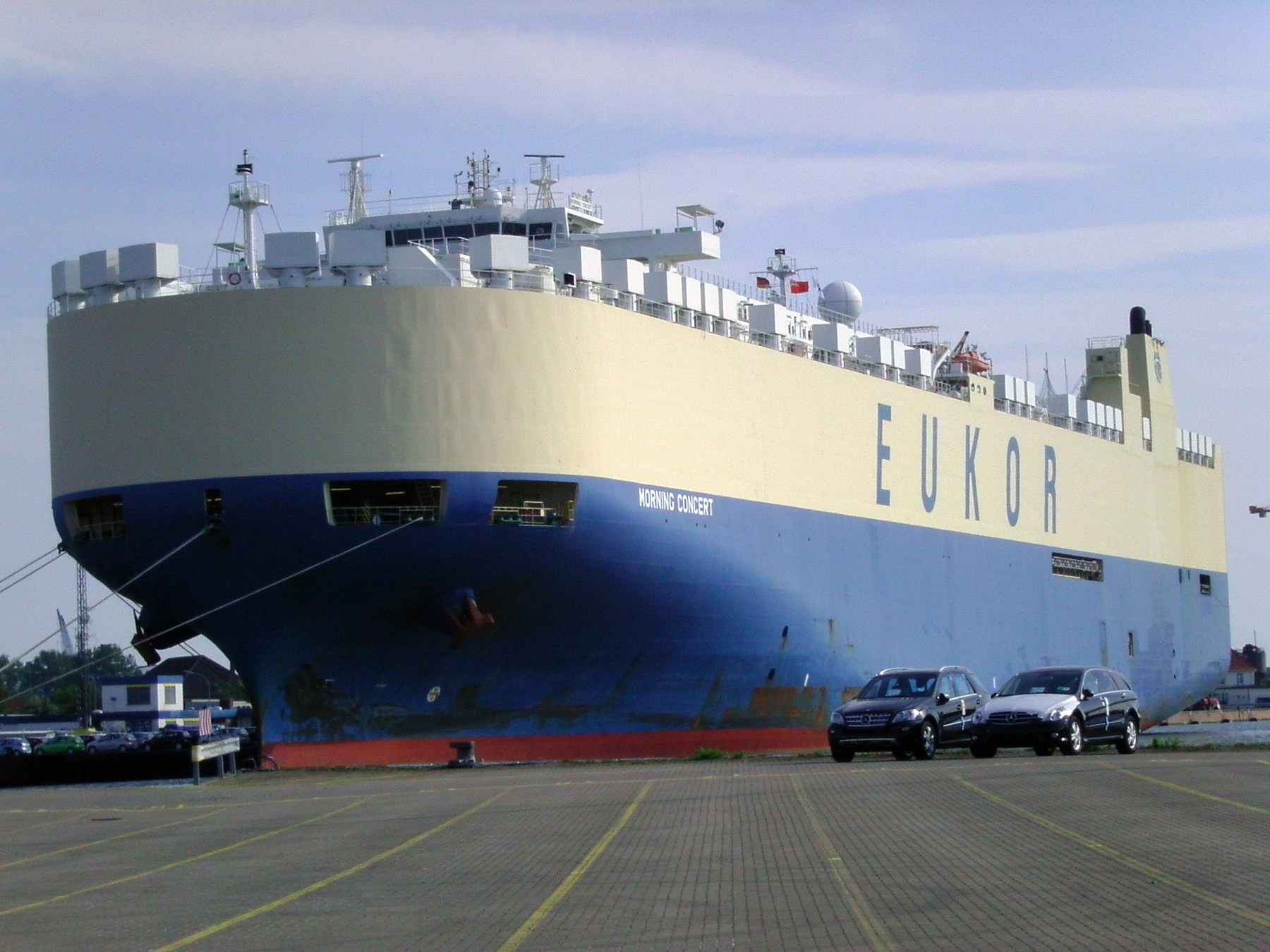
Morning Concert

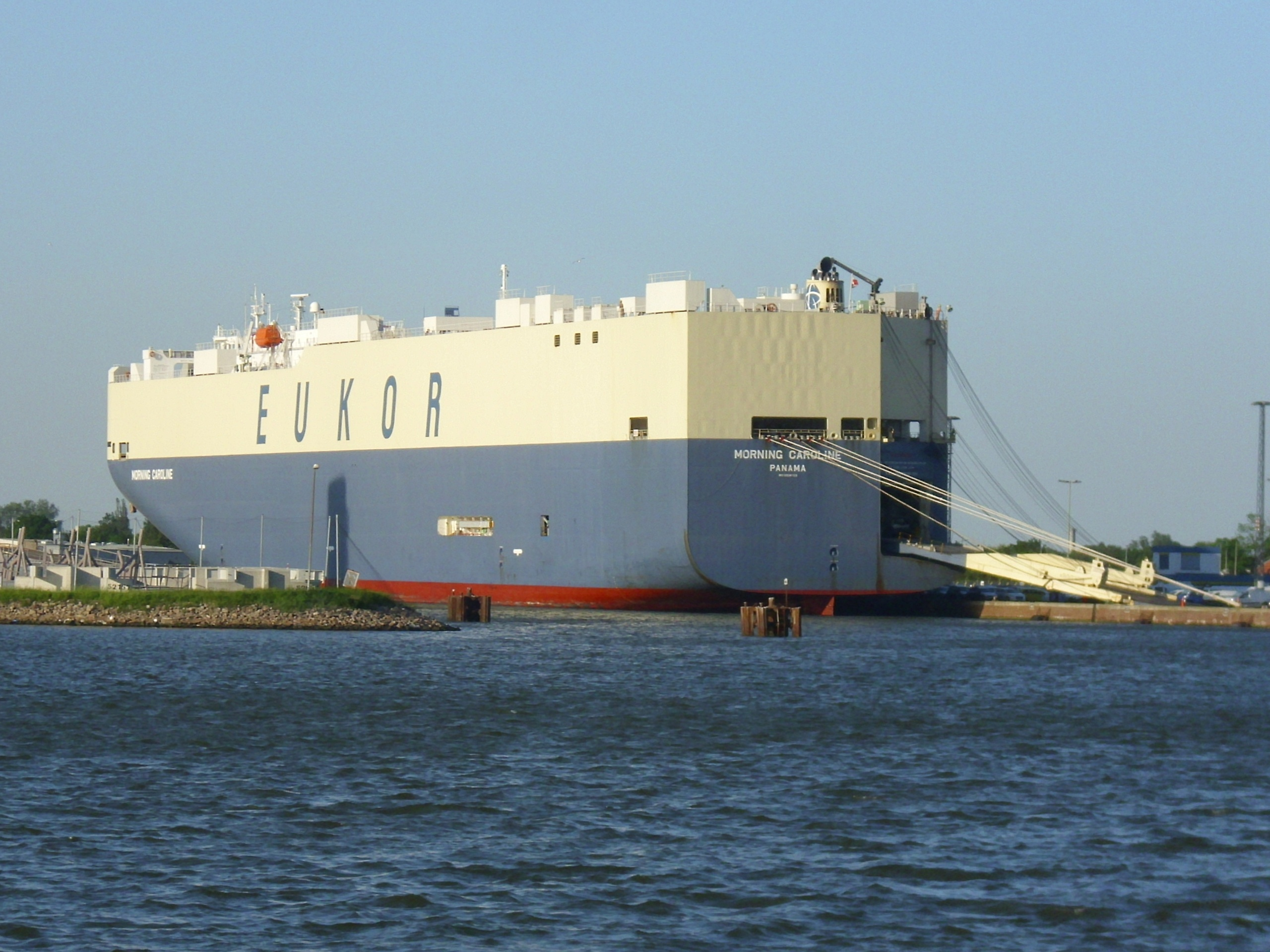
Morning Caroline

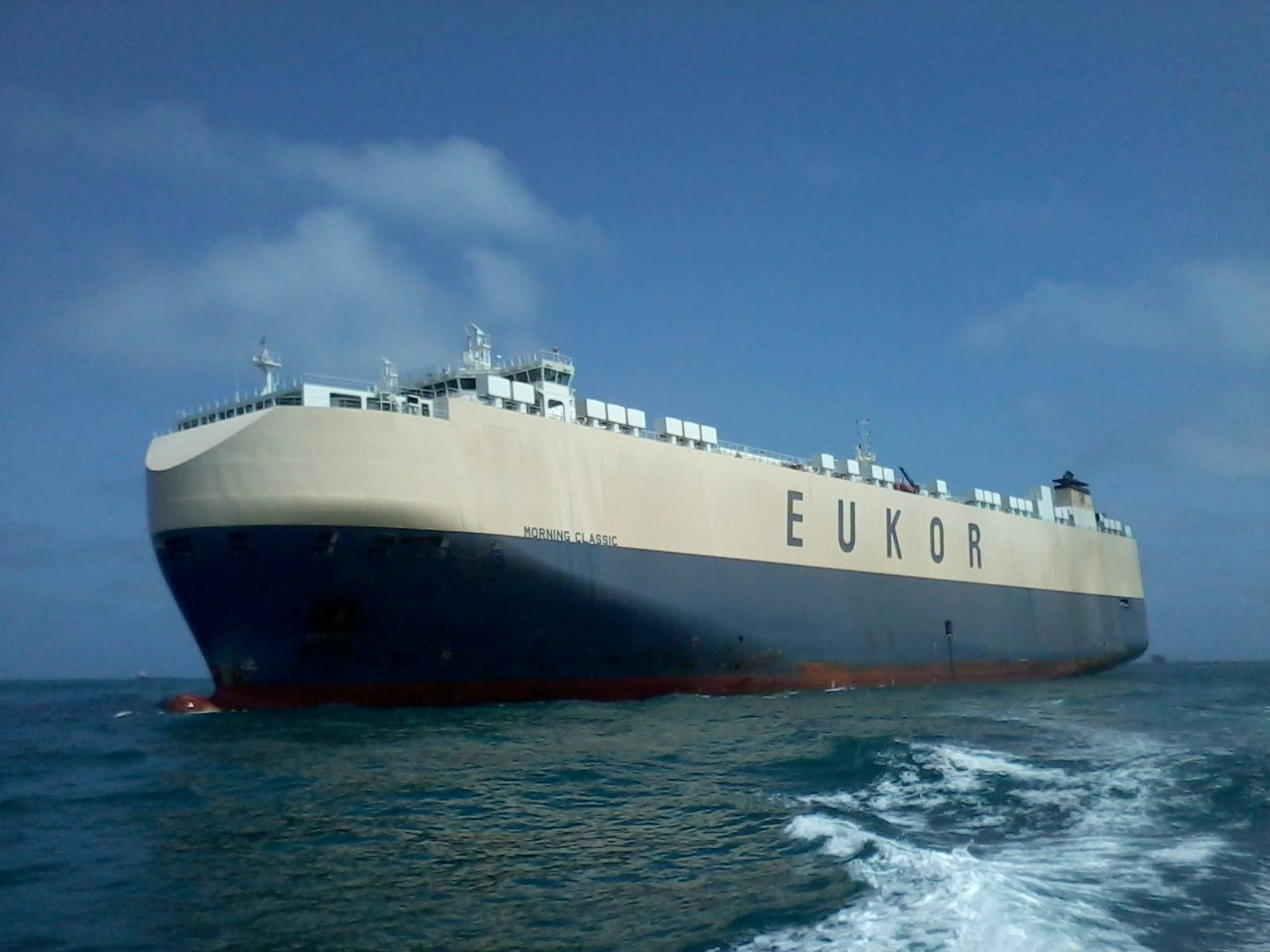
Morning Classic

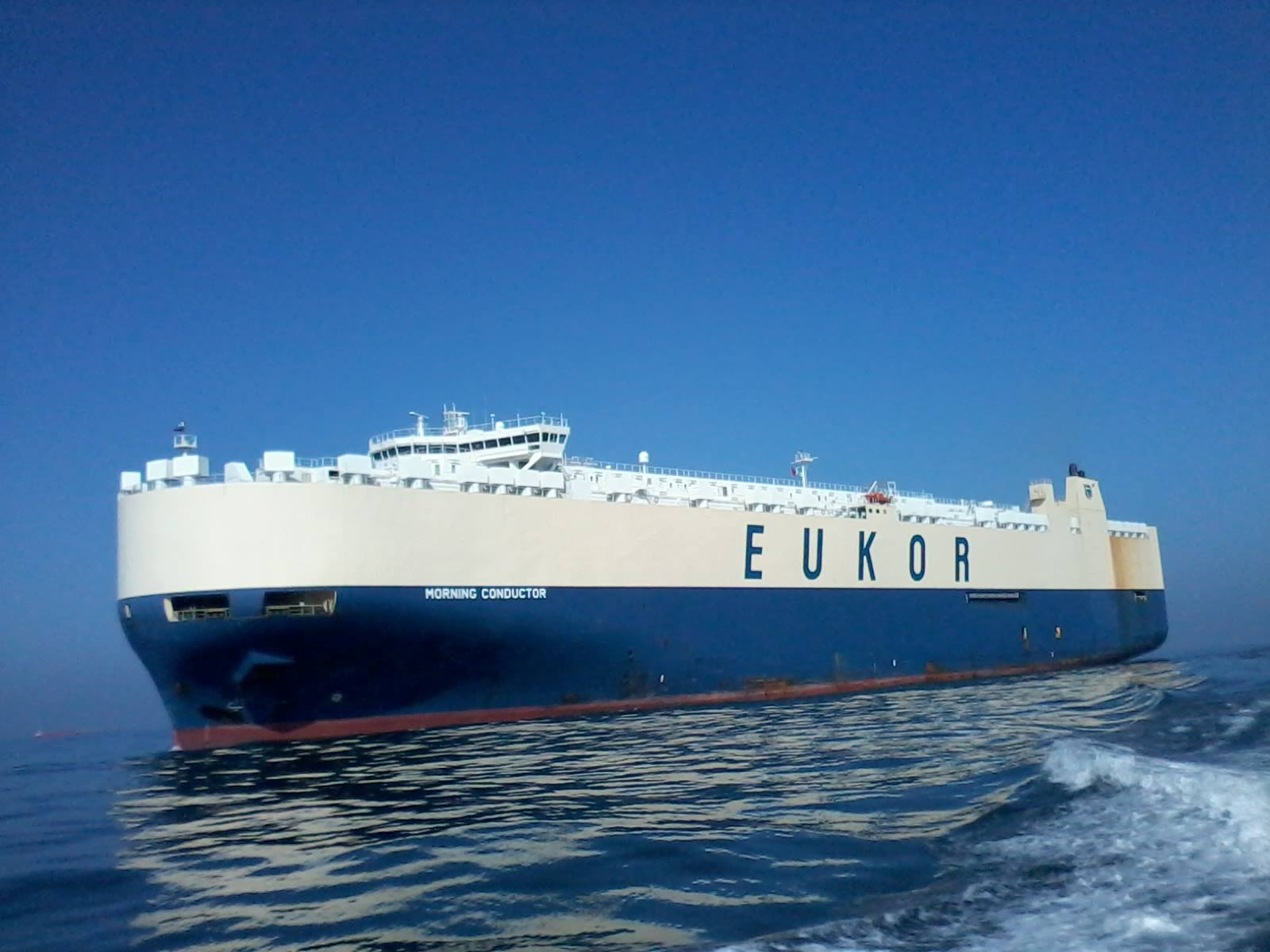
Morning Conductor

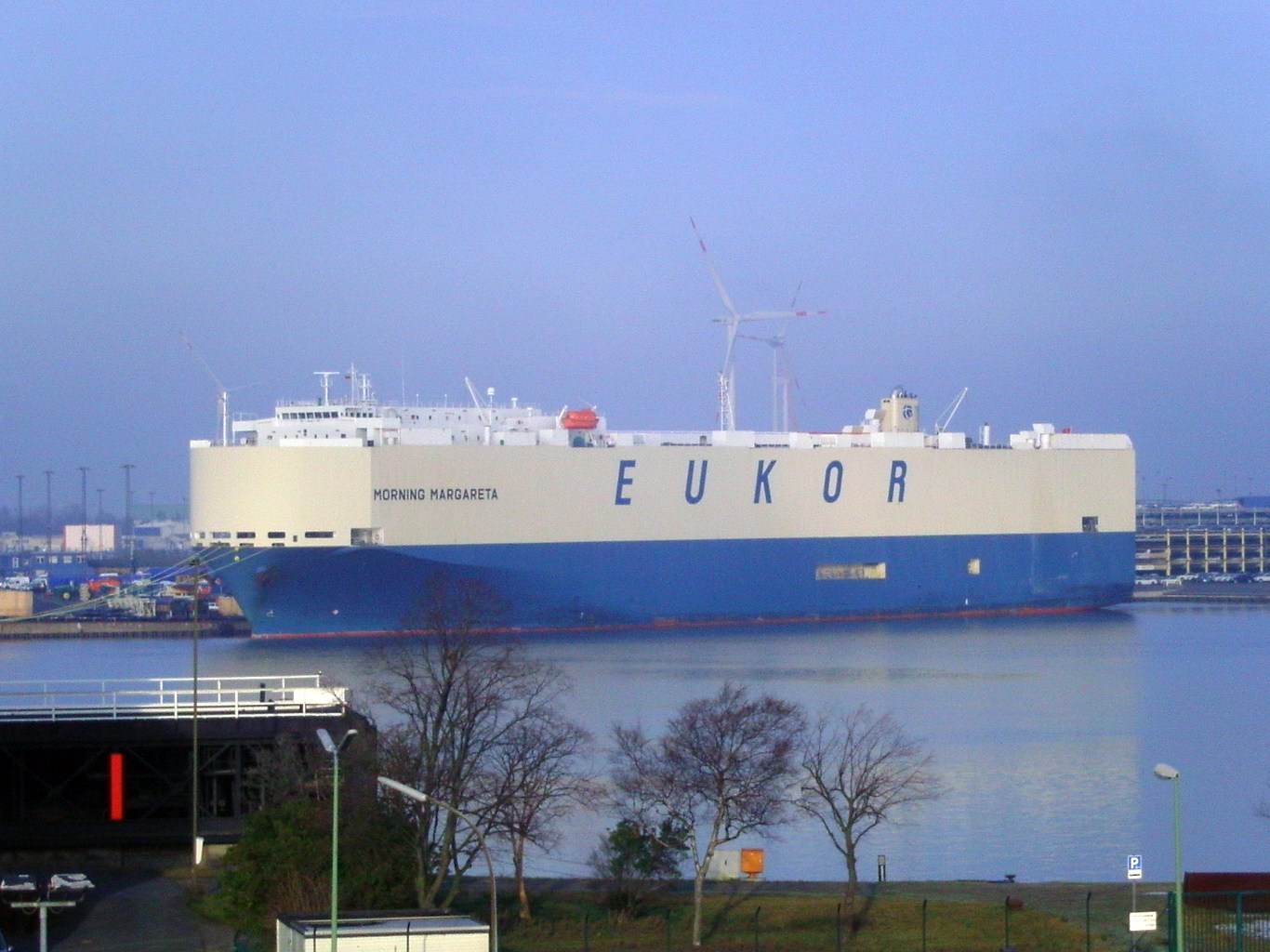
Morning Margareta

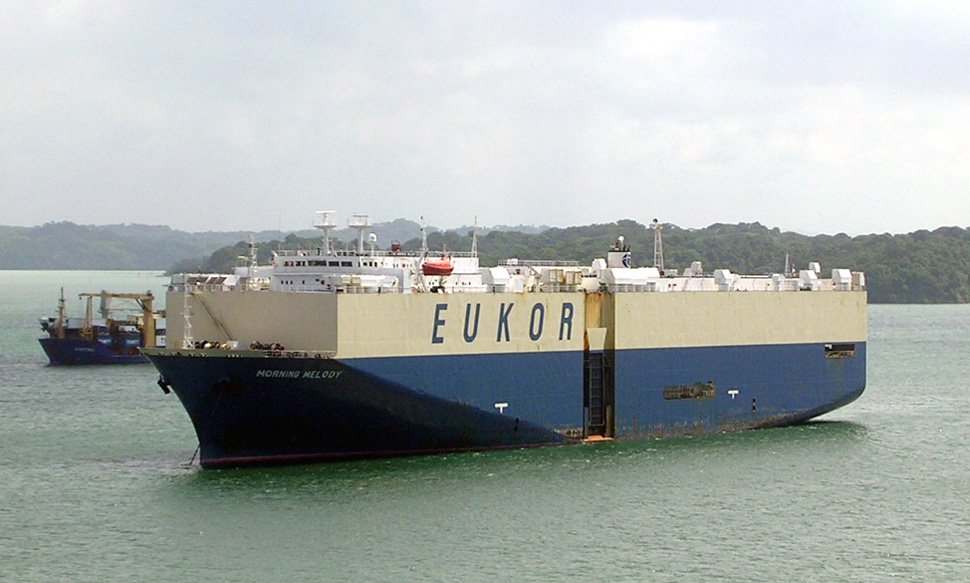
Morning Melody

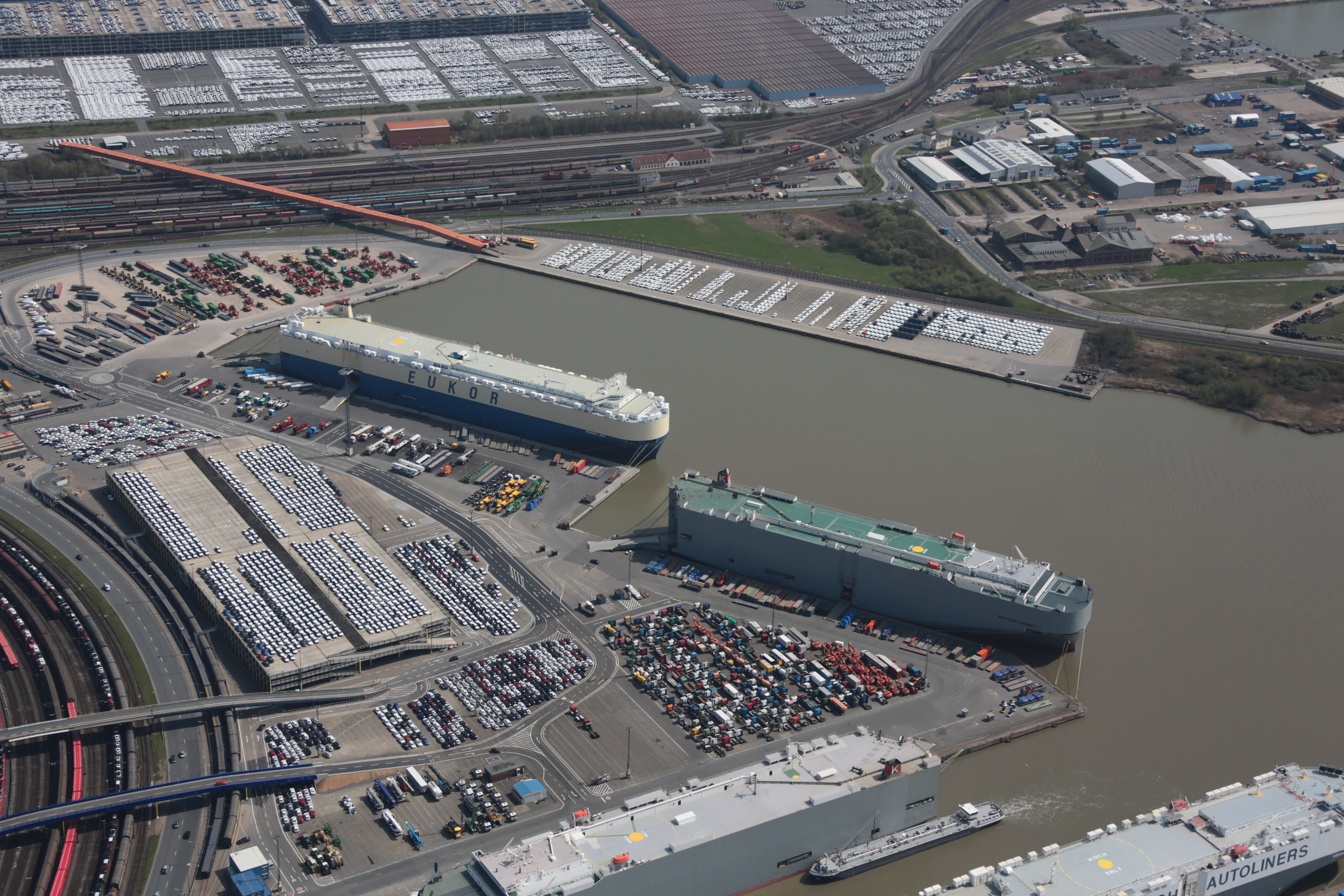
Morning Lena
