= Wallenius Wilhelmsen Logistics =

Norwegian/Swedish shipping company

- M/V Torrens in Adelaide, 2015
- Industry: Shipping
- Founded: 1999
- Headquarters: Lysaker, Norway
- Revenue: ▲US$3.9 billion (2019)
- Number of employees: 8,700 (2019)
- Parent: Wallenius Wilhelmsen
- Website: www.walleniuswilhelmsen.com

Wallenius Wilhelmsen Logistics was a Norwegian-Swedish shipping company, established in 1999 and co-owned by the two shipping companies Wallenius Lines and Wilh. Wilhelmsen.

== Overview ==
Prior to the restructuring and division of its services as the Wallenius Wilhelmsen Group in 2017, the company offered a range of logistics services, including supply chain management, ocean transportation using neo-bulk cargo ships, terminal handling, inland distribution and technical services.

After rebranding and reorganisation, the company remains one of the world's largest in the transporting of roll-on/roll-off equipment: automobiles, heavy machinery (mining, construction, farming equipment), yachts, trains, power stations, trailers, Mafi roll trailers and others.

Headquartered in Oslo and Stockholm, with main regional offices in New York, Tokyo and Melbourne, the company has 8,700 employees worldwide.

In 2017, Wallenius Wilhelmsen Logistics was split into Wallenius Wilhelmsen Ocean and Wallenius Wilhelmsen Solutions, within the Wallenius Wilhelmsen Group. The former manages ocean-bound operations, while the latter provides land-based services to many industries, including the automotive, aerospace, and agricultural machinery sectors. The shipping group currently operates a fleet of 123 vessels.

== See also ==
- Taiko (ship)
- MV Tricolor
- List of roll-on/roll-off vessel accidents
- Wallenius Lines
- Wilh. Wilhelmsen
- American Roll-on Roll-off Carrier
- EUKOR
- United European Car Carriers
- Nippon Yusen Kaisha

== Gallery ==
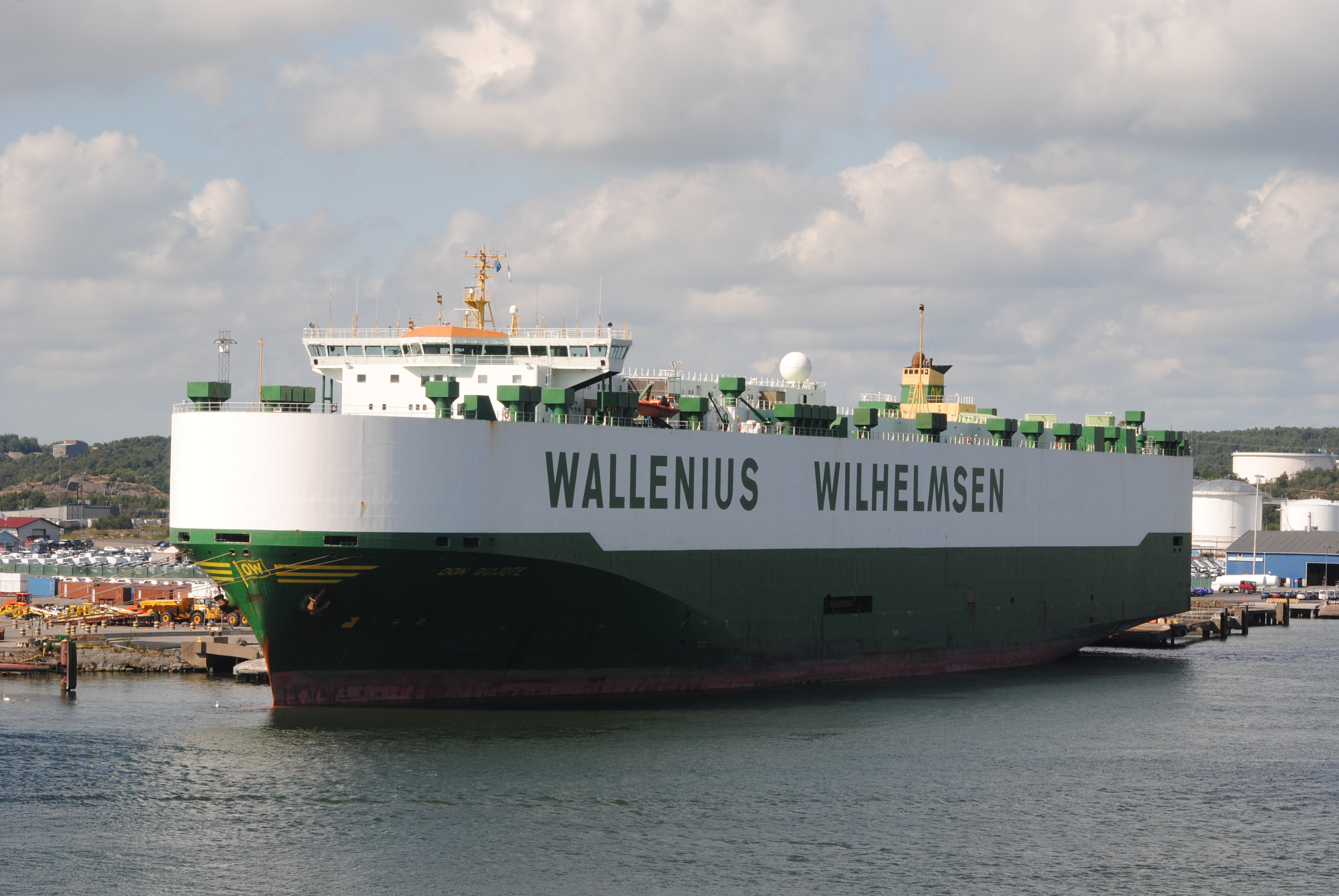
Don Quijote, a WWL car carrier.

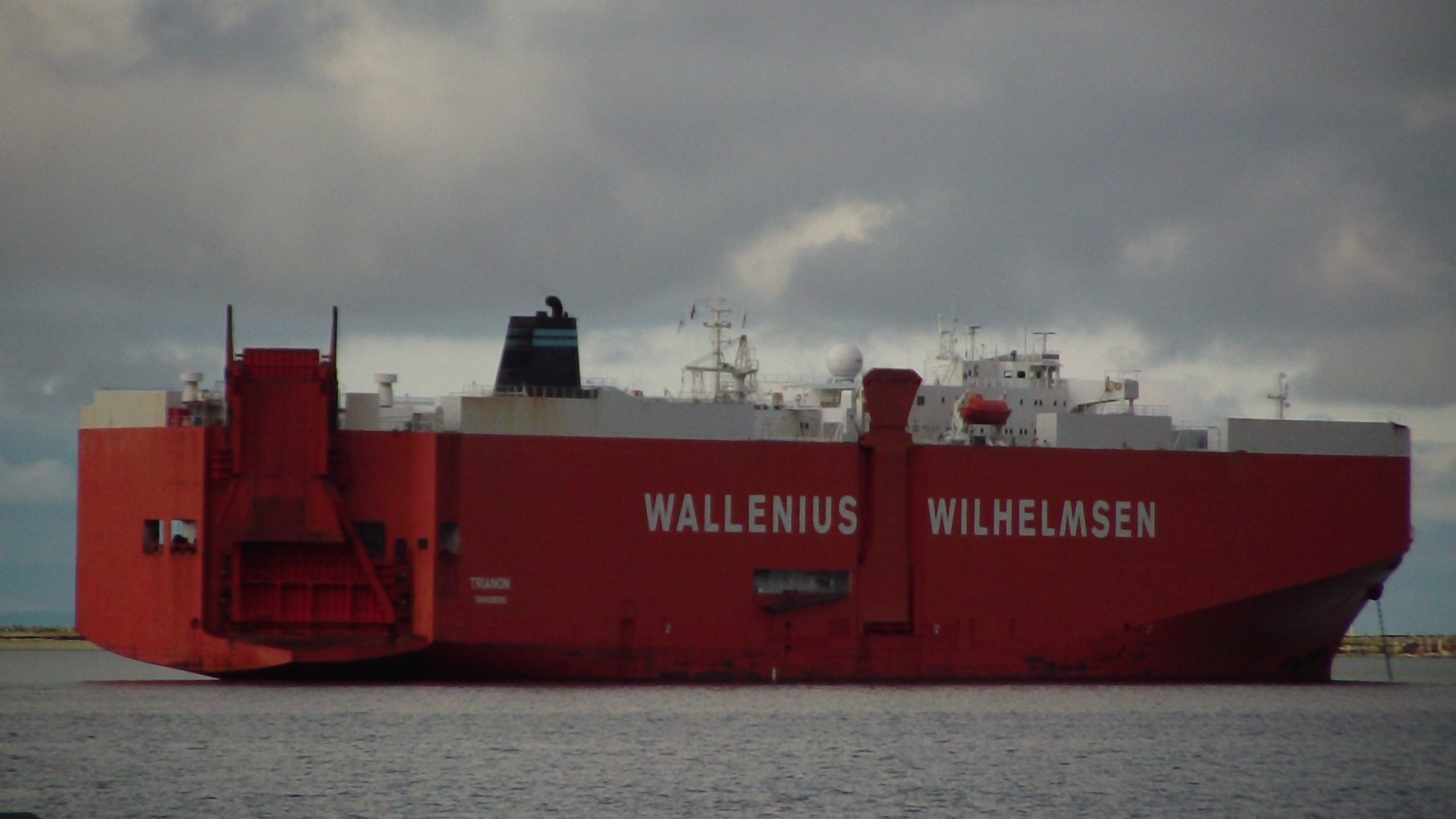
Trianon in the Strait of Juan de Fuca.

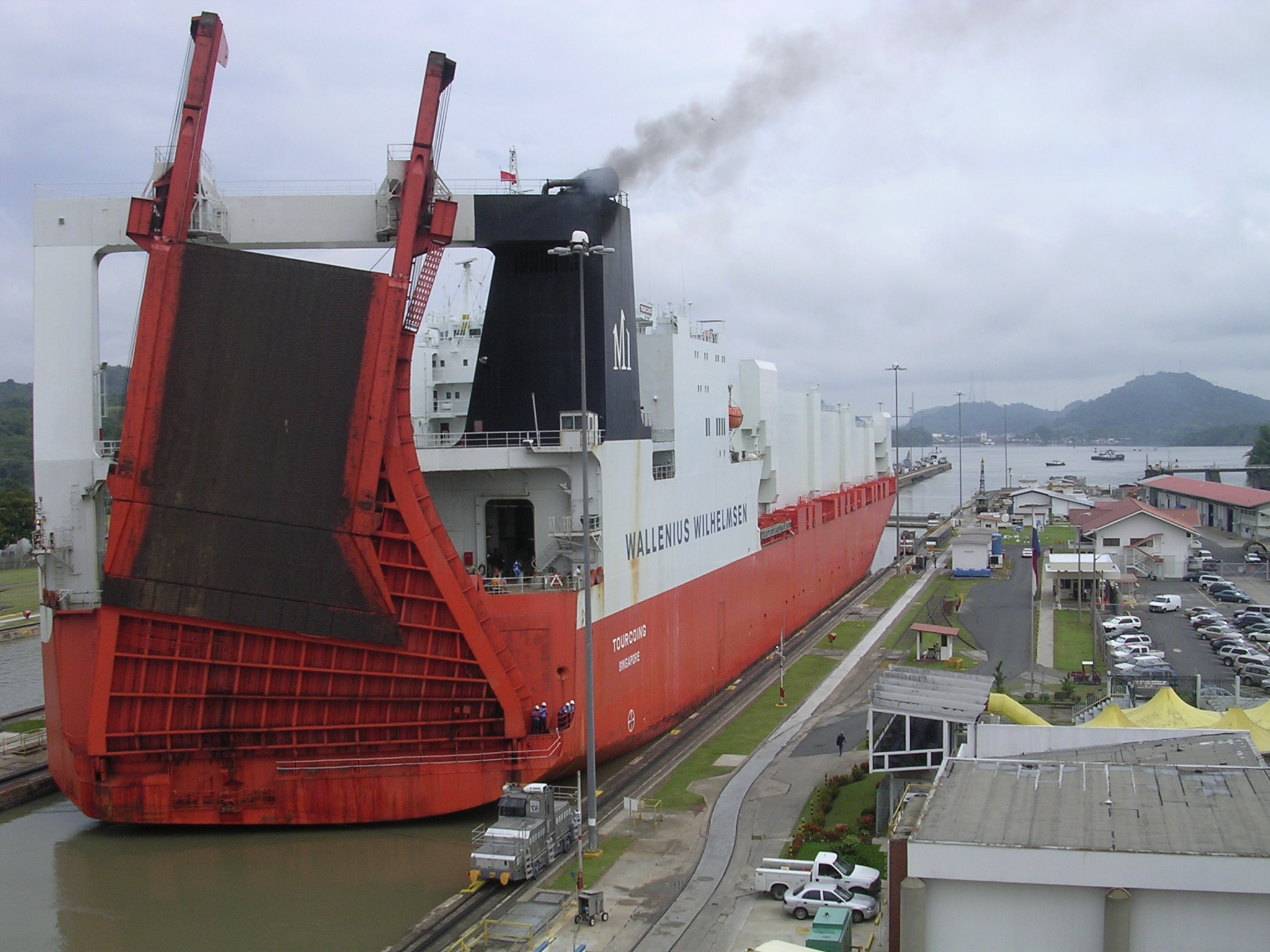
RORO carrier Tourcoing passing through Panama Canal.
