= United European Car Carriers =

Shipping company

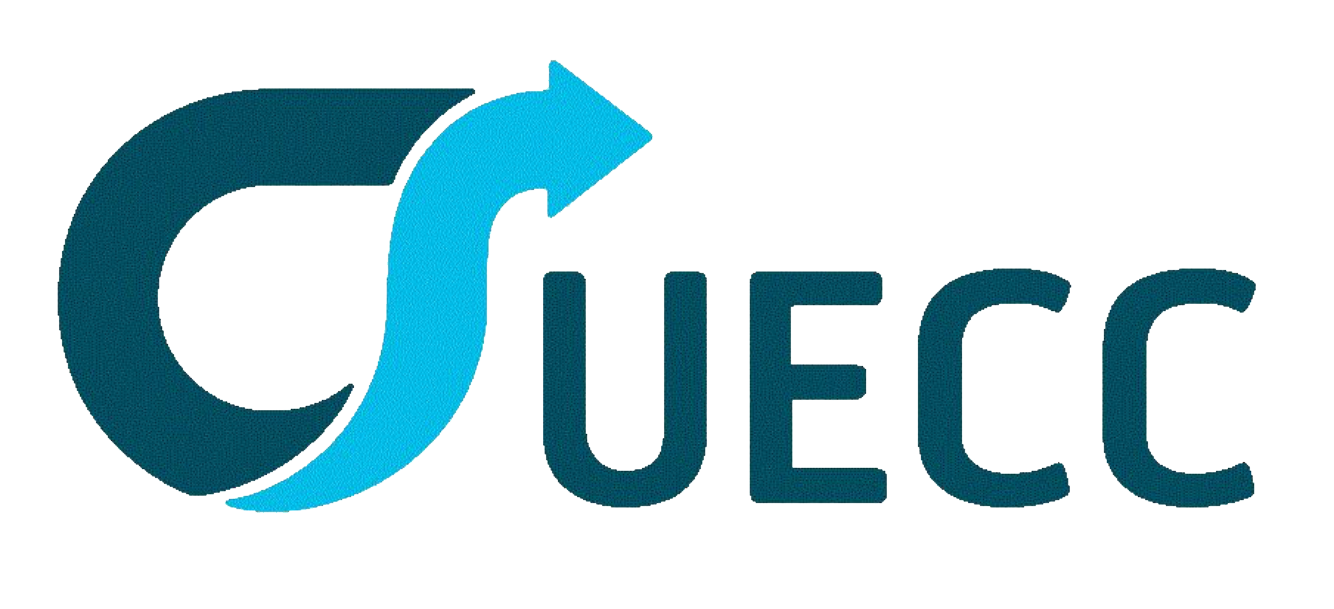

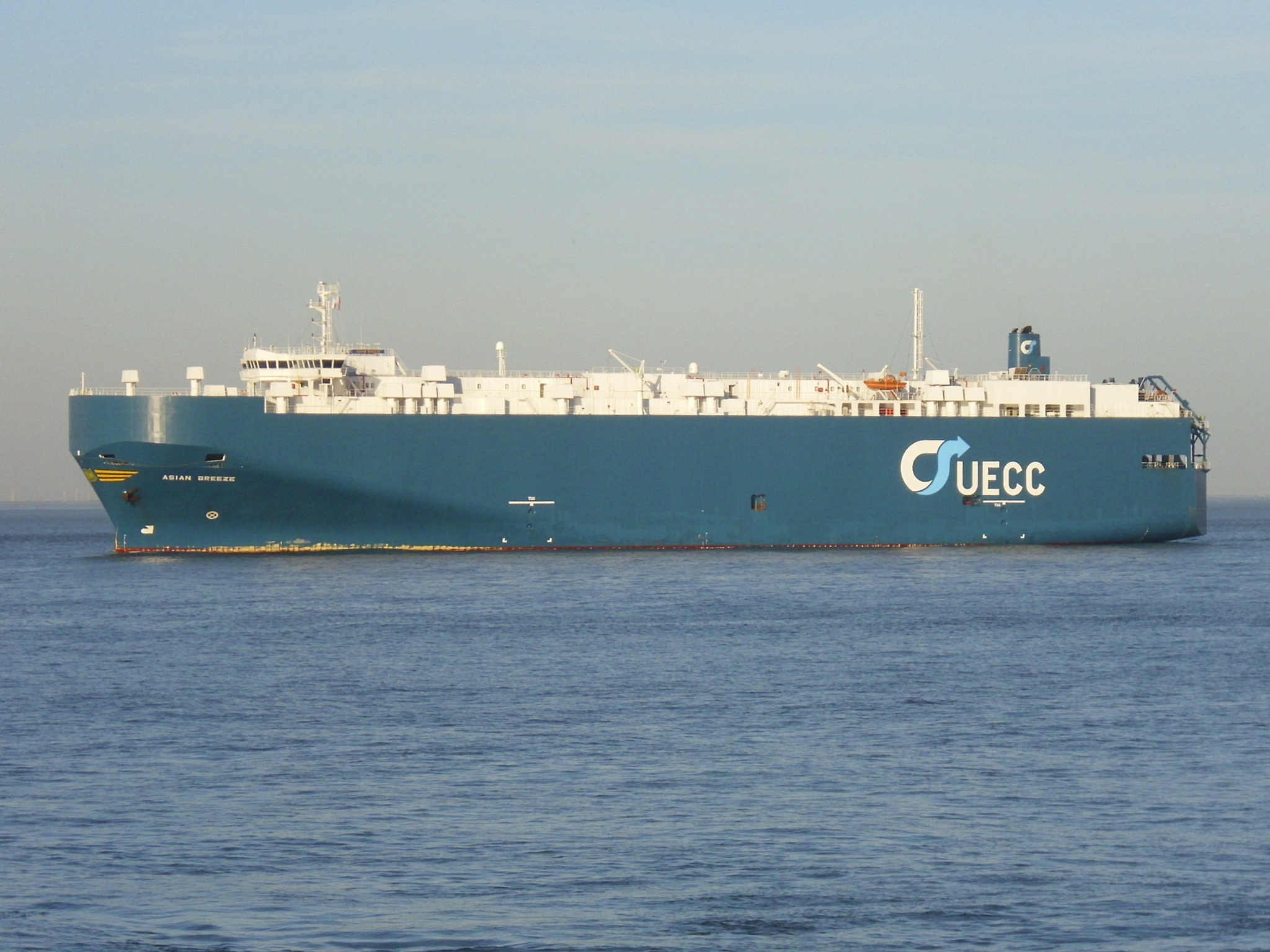
- Industry: Transport
- Founded: 1990
- Headquarters: Oslo, Norway
- Number of employees: 350
- Website: uecc.com

United European Car Carriers (UECC) is a Norwegian roll-on/roll-off shipping line, created in 1990 and based in Oslo, Norway. The company primarily transports cargo on short sea routes within Europe.

== History ==
The company had its roots in Ugland-Aall Car Carriers (UACC), established in the 1970s. Johan Benad Ugland was a shareholder in the group. In 1990, its commercial operations and fleet of 19 vessels were sold (and rebranded as United European Car Carriers) to focus together with Leif Höegh & Co, on Hoegh-Ugland Autoliners ("HUAL") as a deep sea Roll-on/roll-off carrier.
From 1990, UECC is jointly owned by Nippon Yusen Kaisha and Wallenius Lines, in a 50-50 share agreement.

The main purpose of the acquisition was the plan to offer short sea service for Japanese automobile manufacturers that had manufacturing plants in Europe, along with improving the intra-Europe feeder network, by providing extensive connections to a number of destinations that could not be served by oceanic vessels due to physical or commercial limitations.

UECC was the first roll-on/roll-off line to build and deploy a liquified natural gas-powered ship. In 2016, the company took delivery of two dual fuel LNG pure car and truck carriers, Auto Eco and Auto Energy, of the 1A Super Finnish/Swedish ice class. At that time, the vessels were the largest dual fuel vessels in the world, with a capacity of 4,000 cars each.

== Operations ==
UECC has 18 vessels that call at over 25 ports every week. Its trade routes include Belgium-Germany to the Scandinavian and Baltic countries (in the past also Russia), Mediterranean to Northern Europe (including Greece, Turkey, Italy), Spain and France to UK and Netherlands.

The main business is the domestic maritime transport and distribution of cargo such as automobiles, trucks, trailers, Mafi roll trailers, heavy construction machineries and further types of rolling freight.

The company is also active in terminal operations, controlling some of the on-shore activities, vehicles handling and storage facilities of ports such as Pasajes and Vigo in Spain, and Zeebrugge in Belgium. Aside from its headquarters in Oslo, UECC also has four other branch offices in Madrid, Setubal, Odessa and Grimsby.

== See also ==
- KESS - K Line Europe Short Sea
- Euro Marine Logistics
- Nissan Motor Car Carrier
- Toyofuji Shipping

== Ships gallery ==
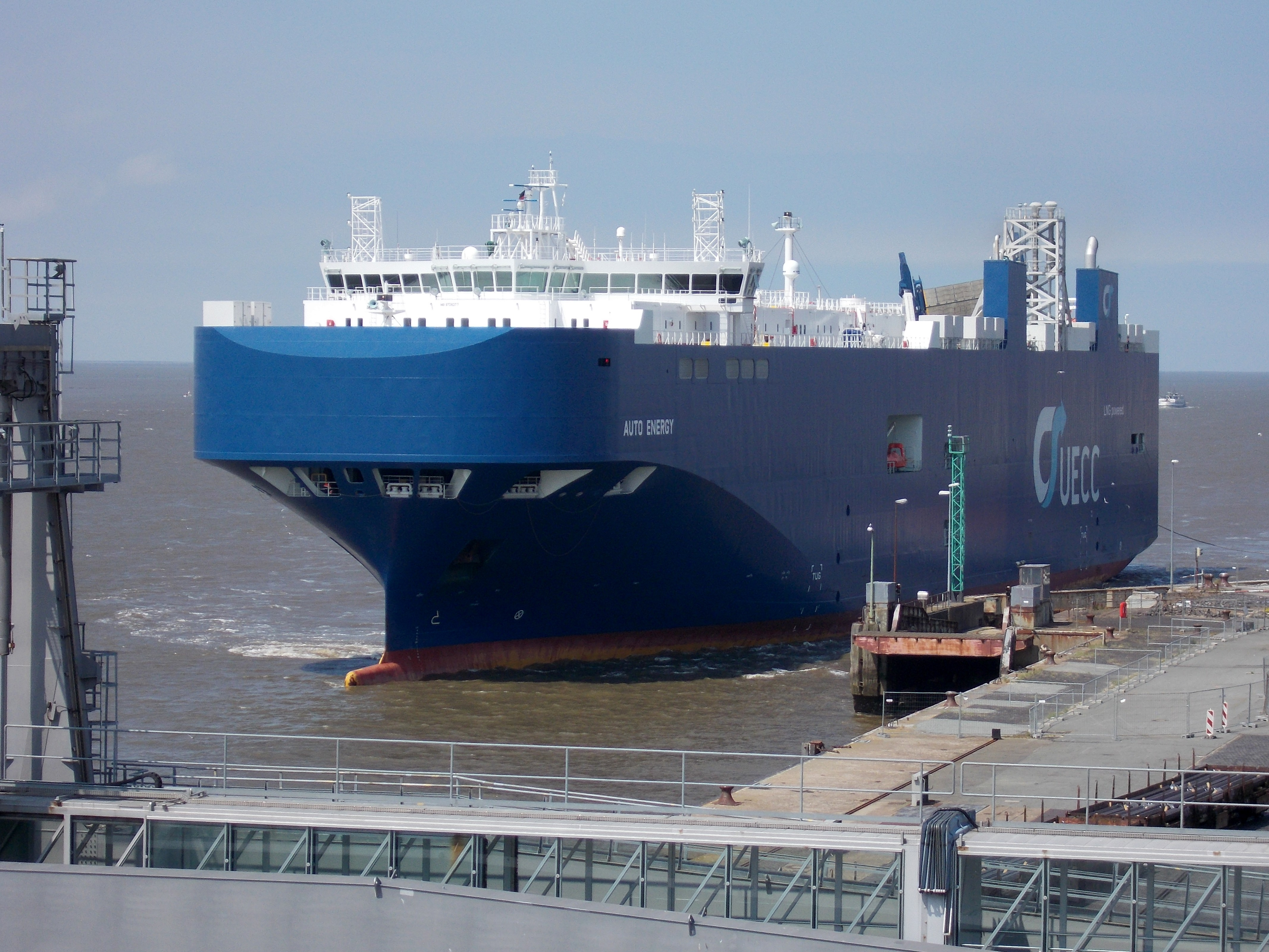
Auto Energy

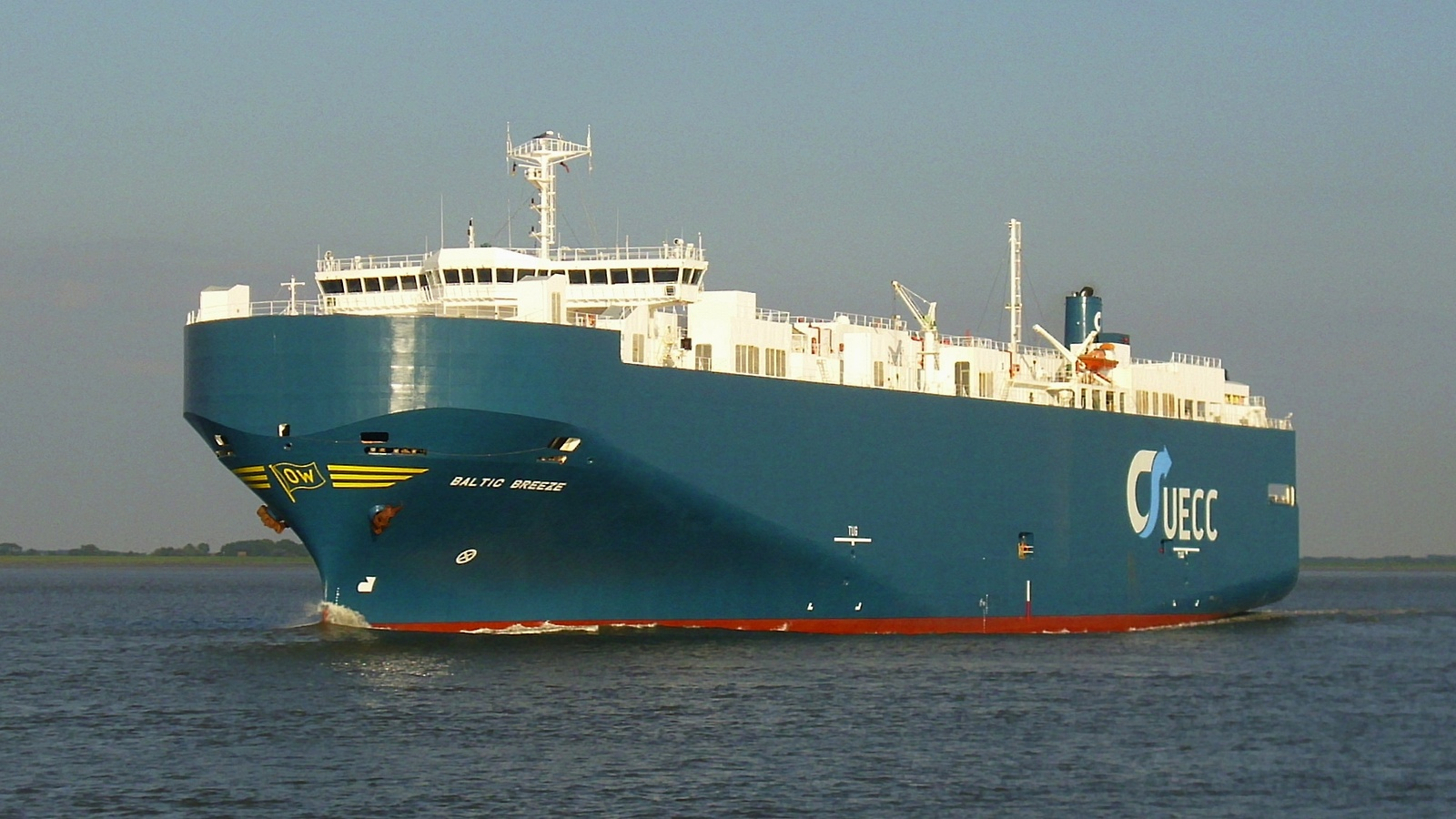
Baltic Breeze

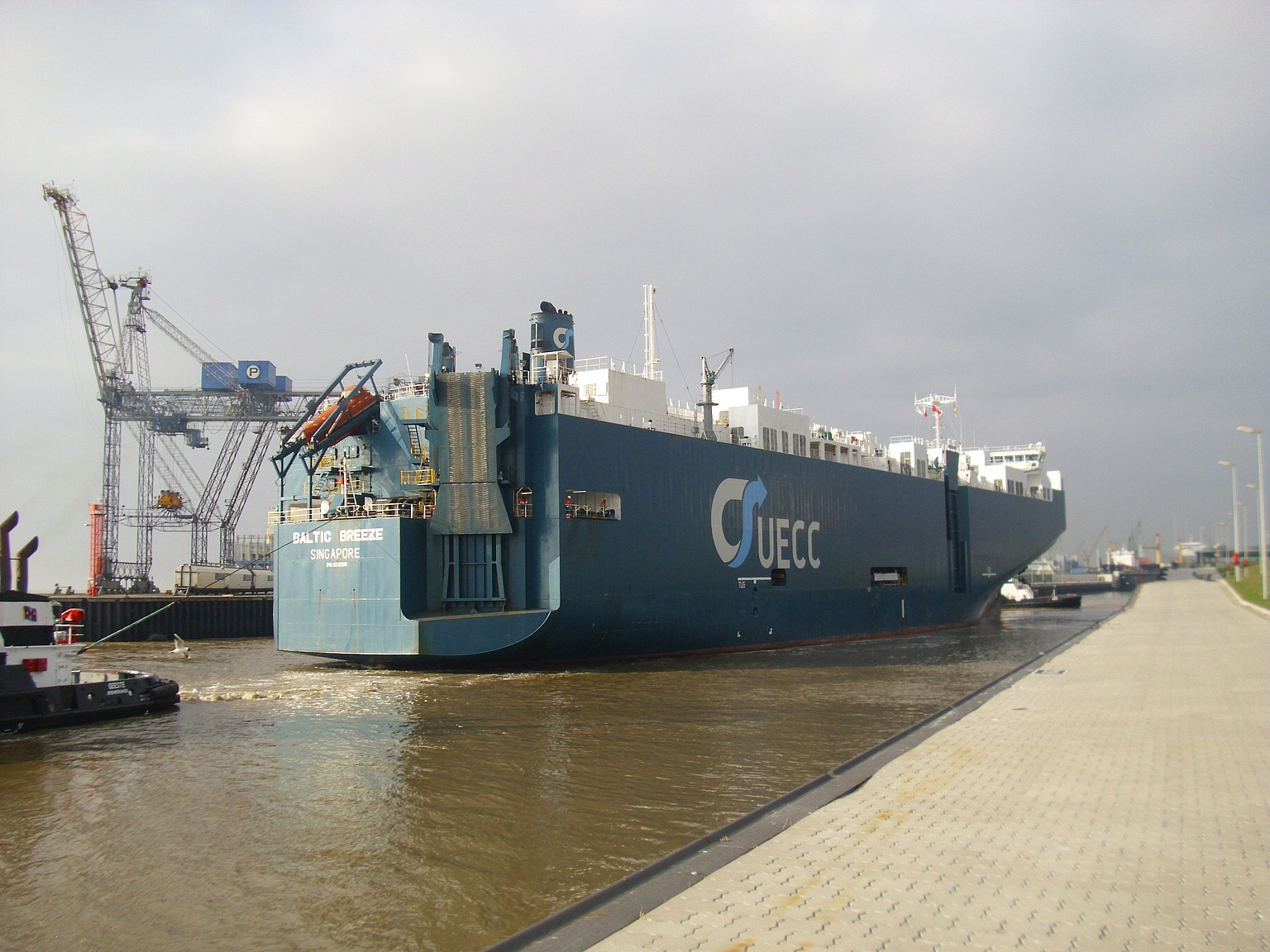
Baltic Breeze stern

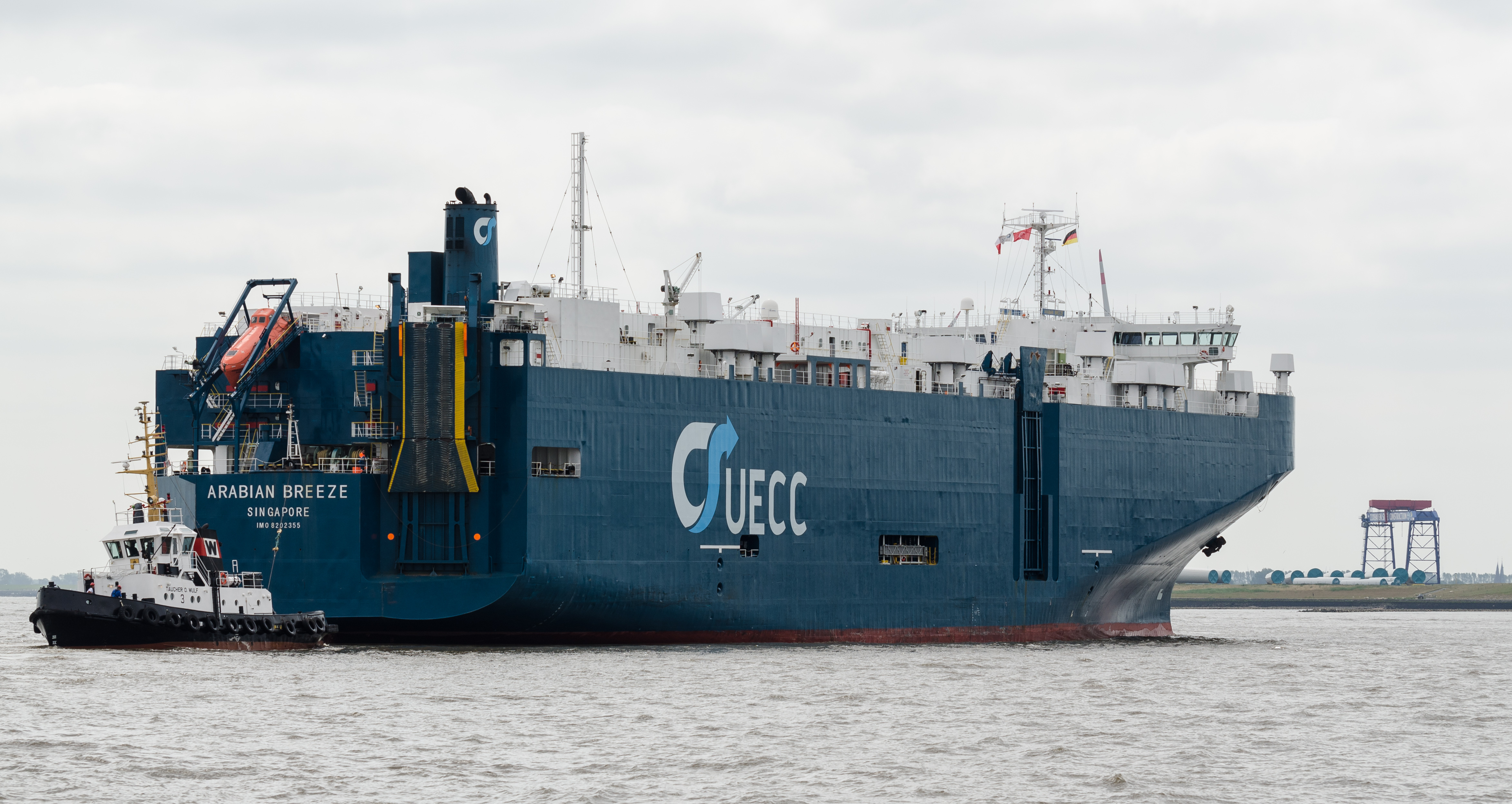
Arabian Breeze

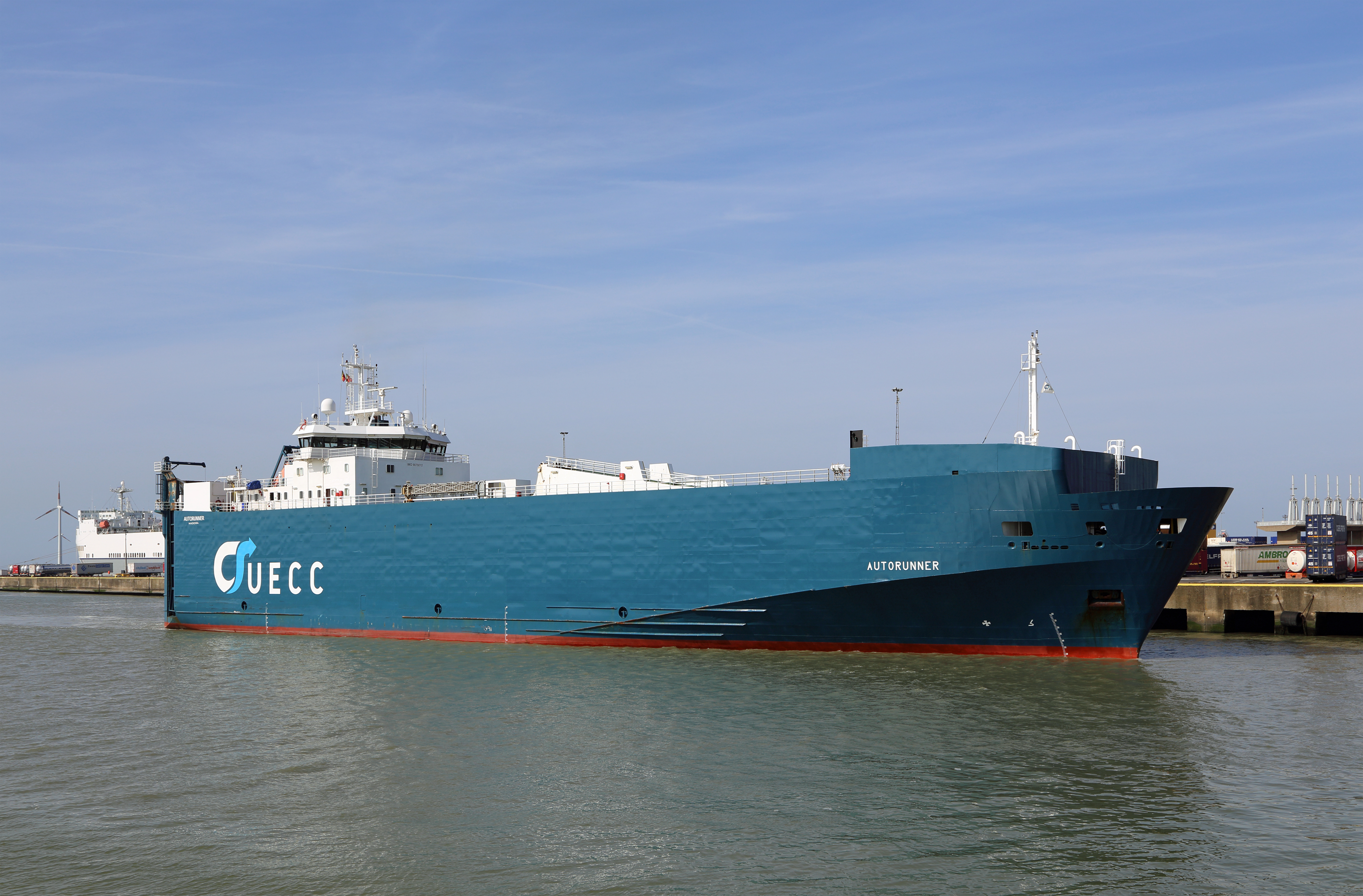
Autorunner

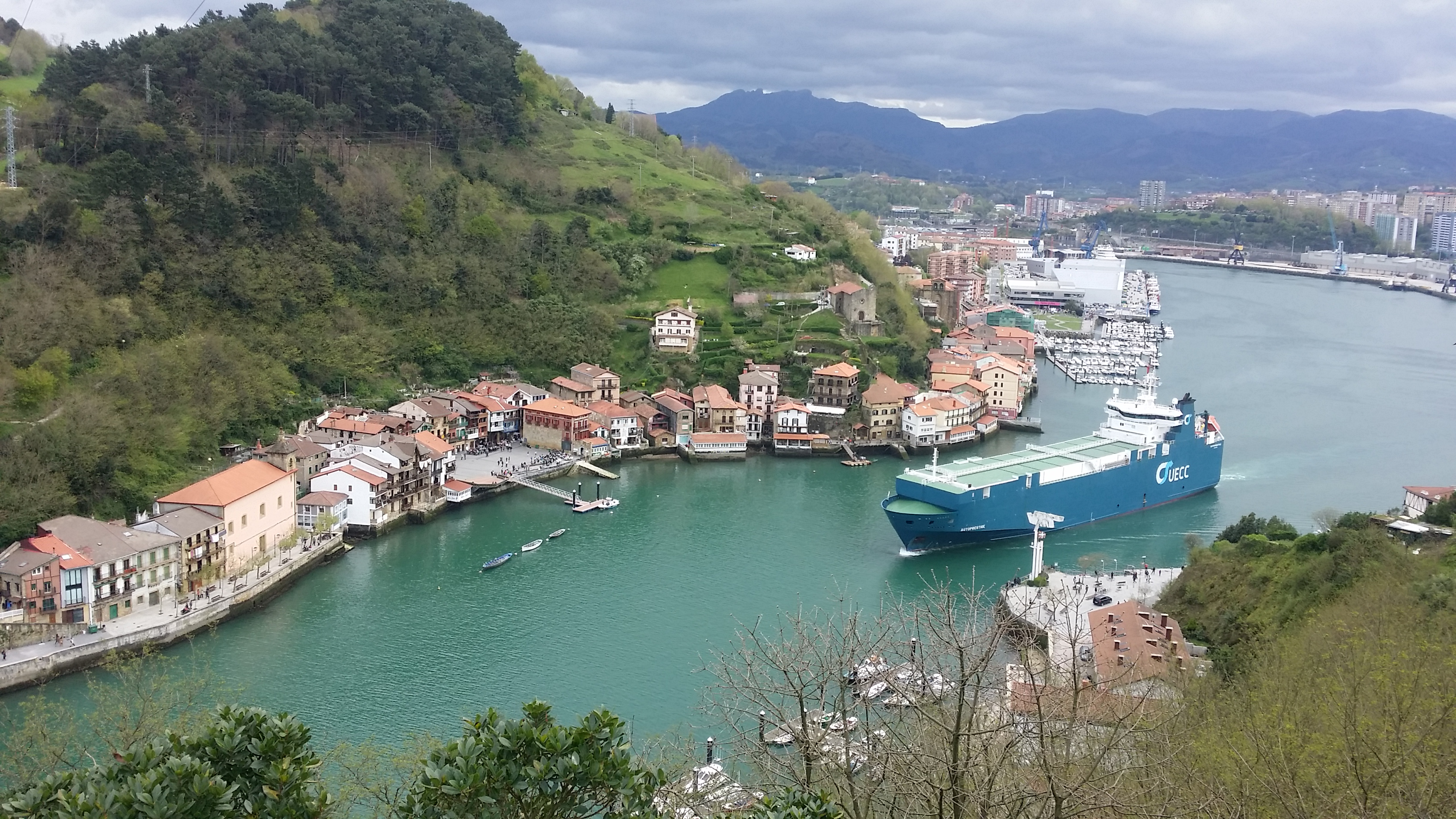
UECC ship in Spain

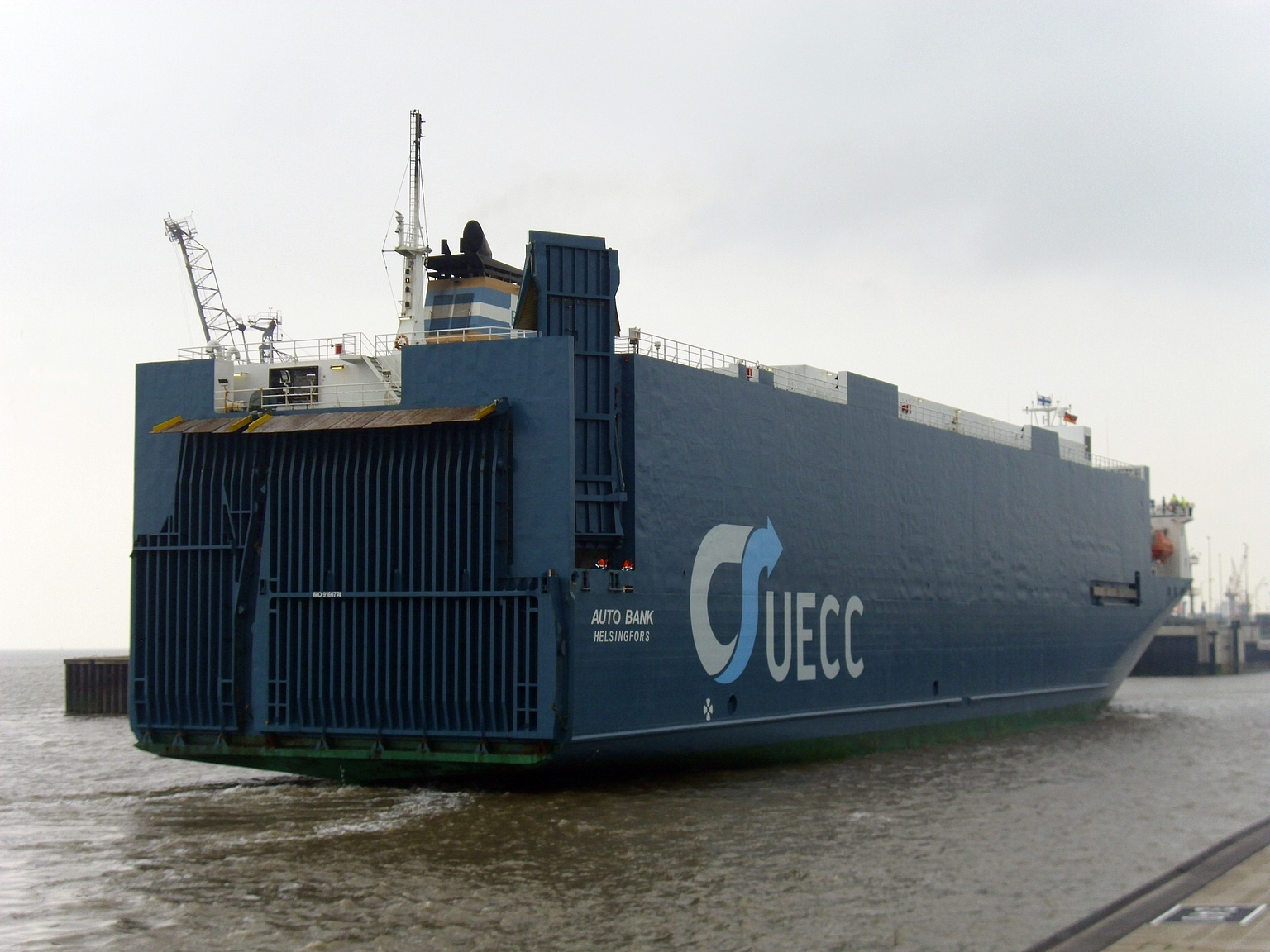
Auto Bank stern

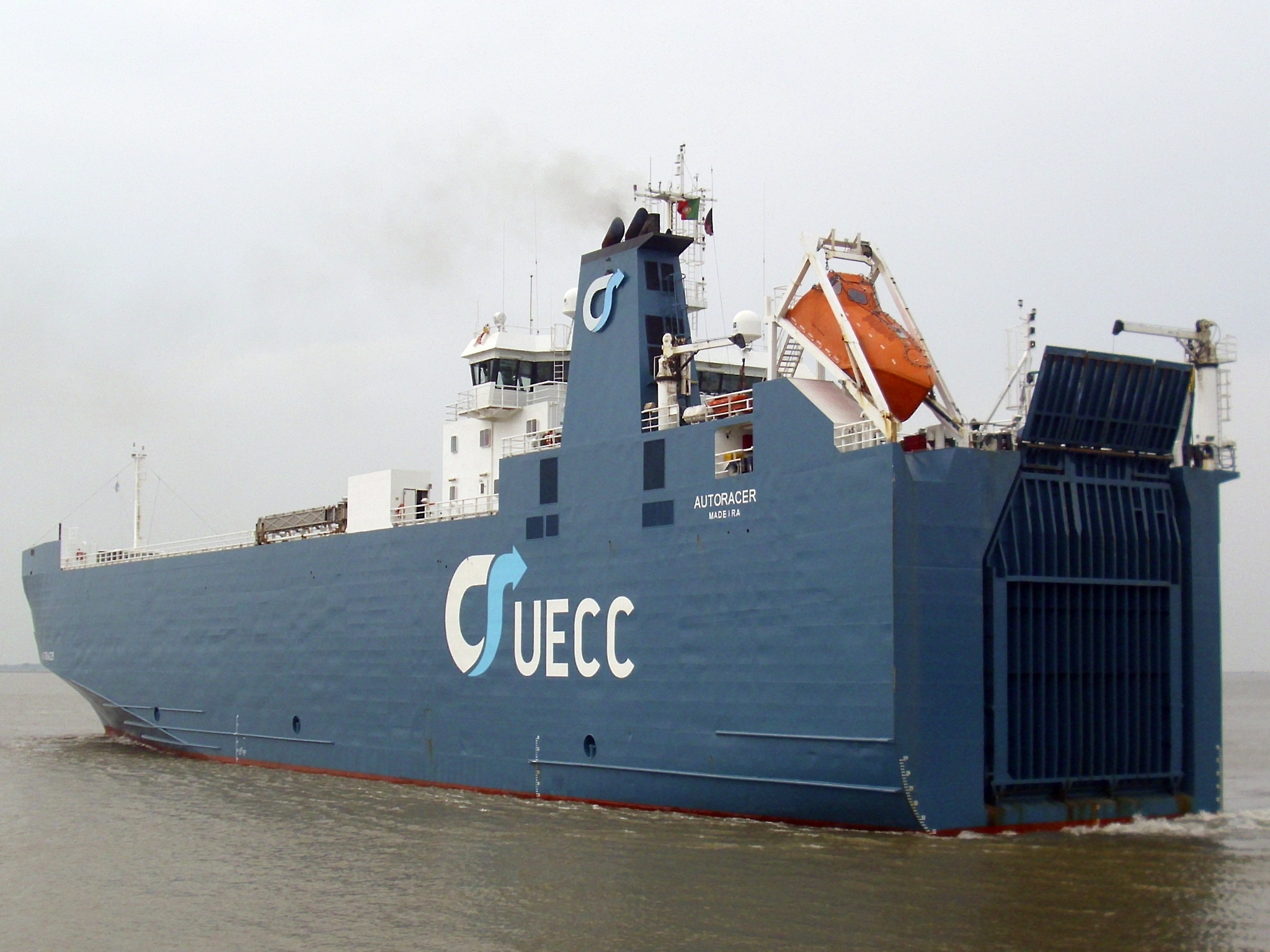
Autoracer

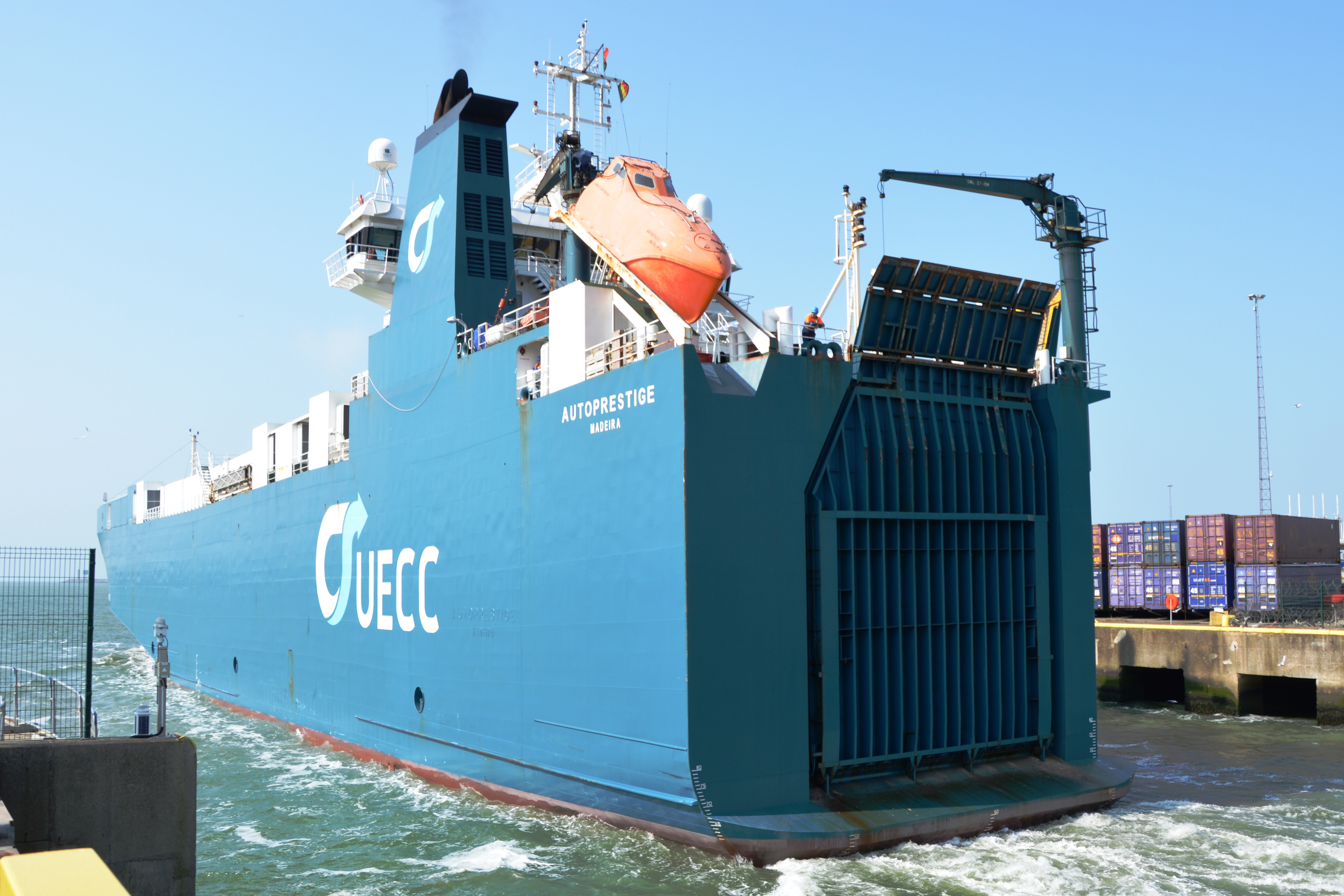
Autoprestige at Zeebrugge

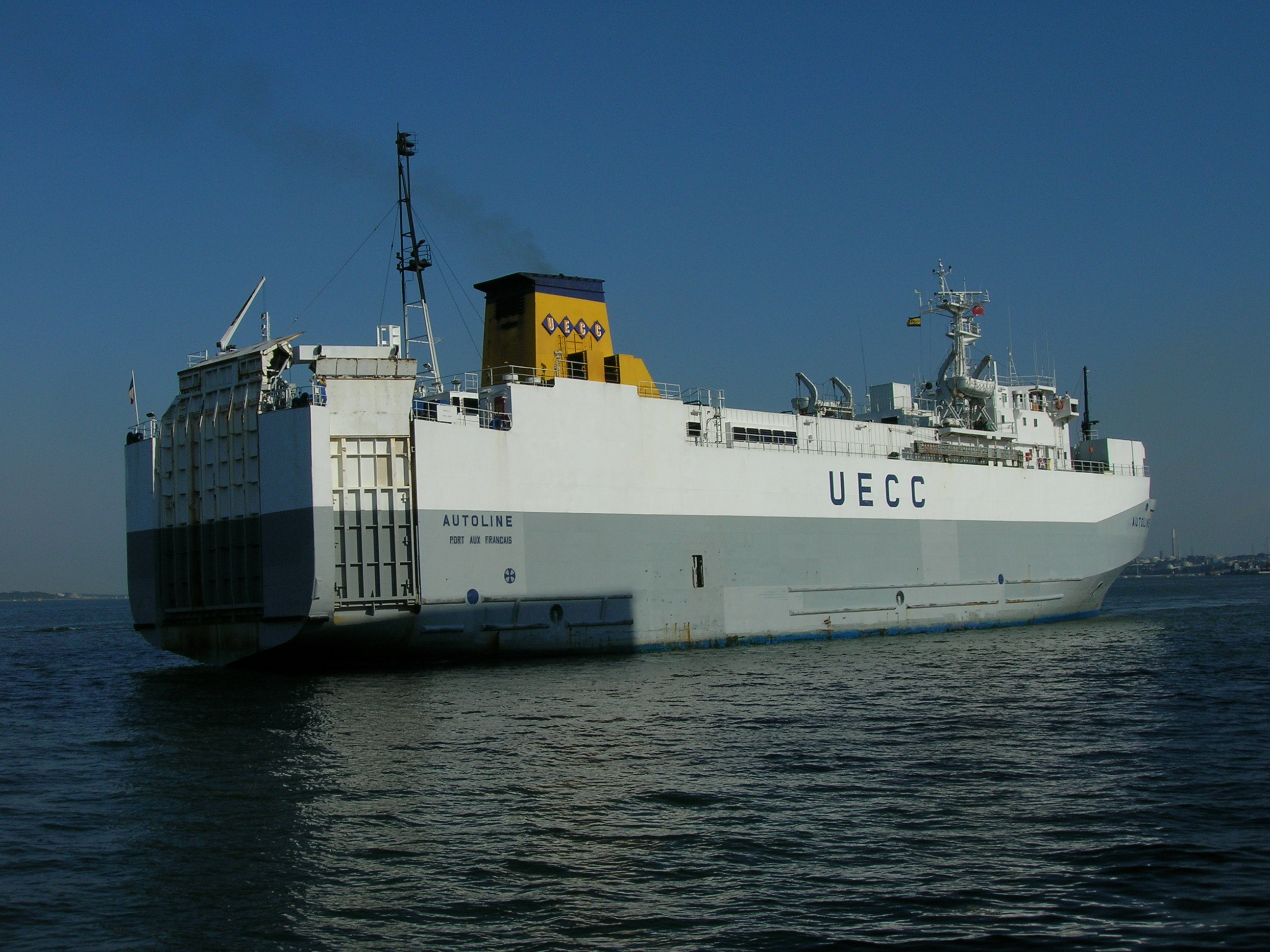
Autoline

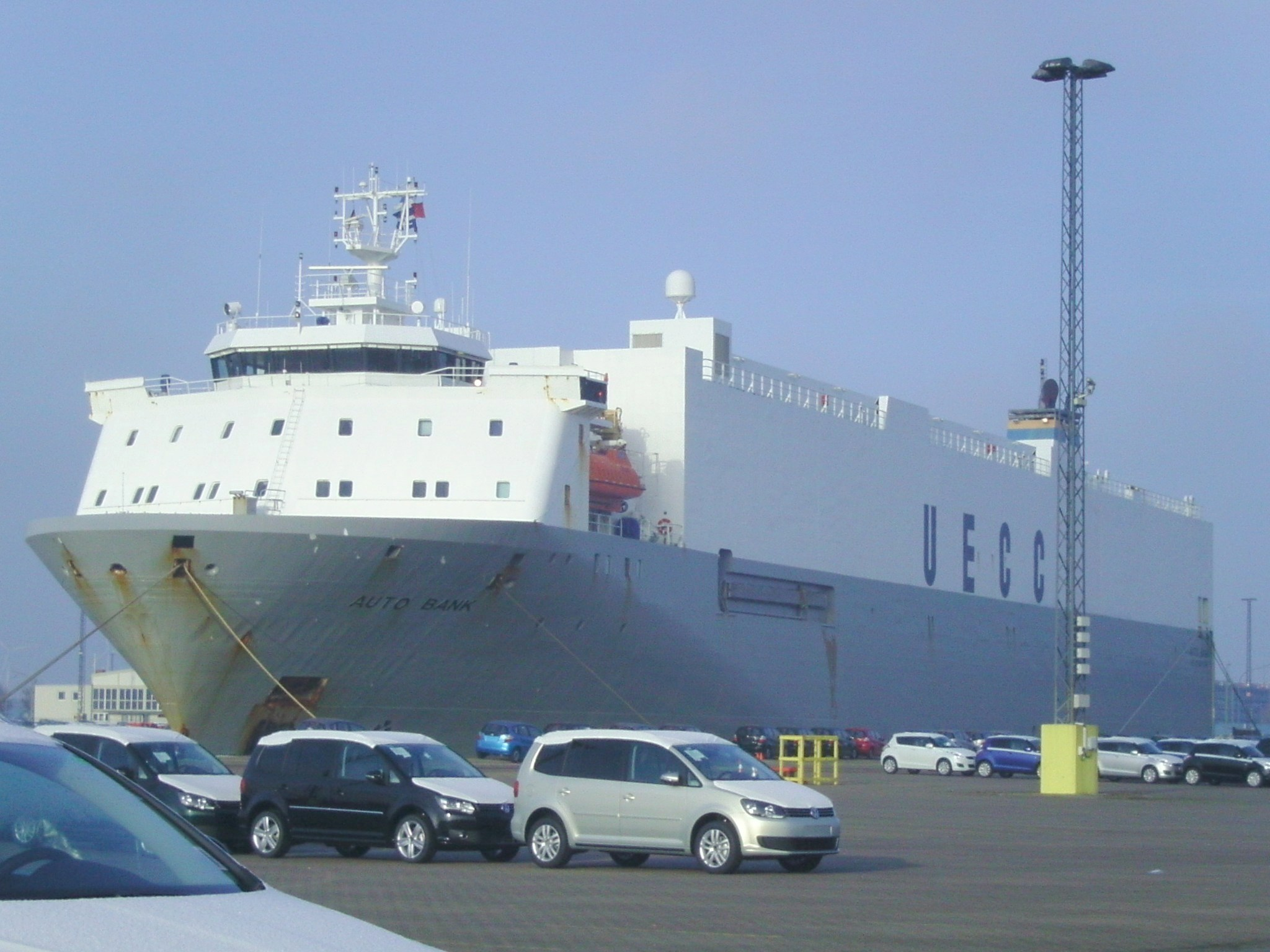
Auto Bank

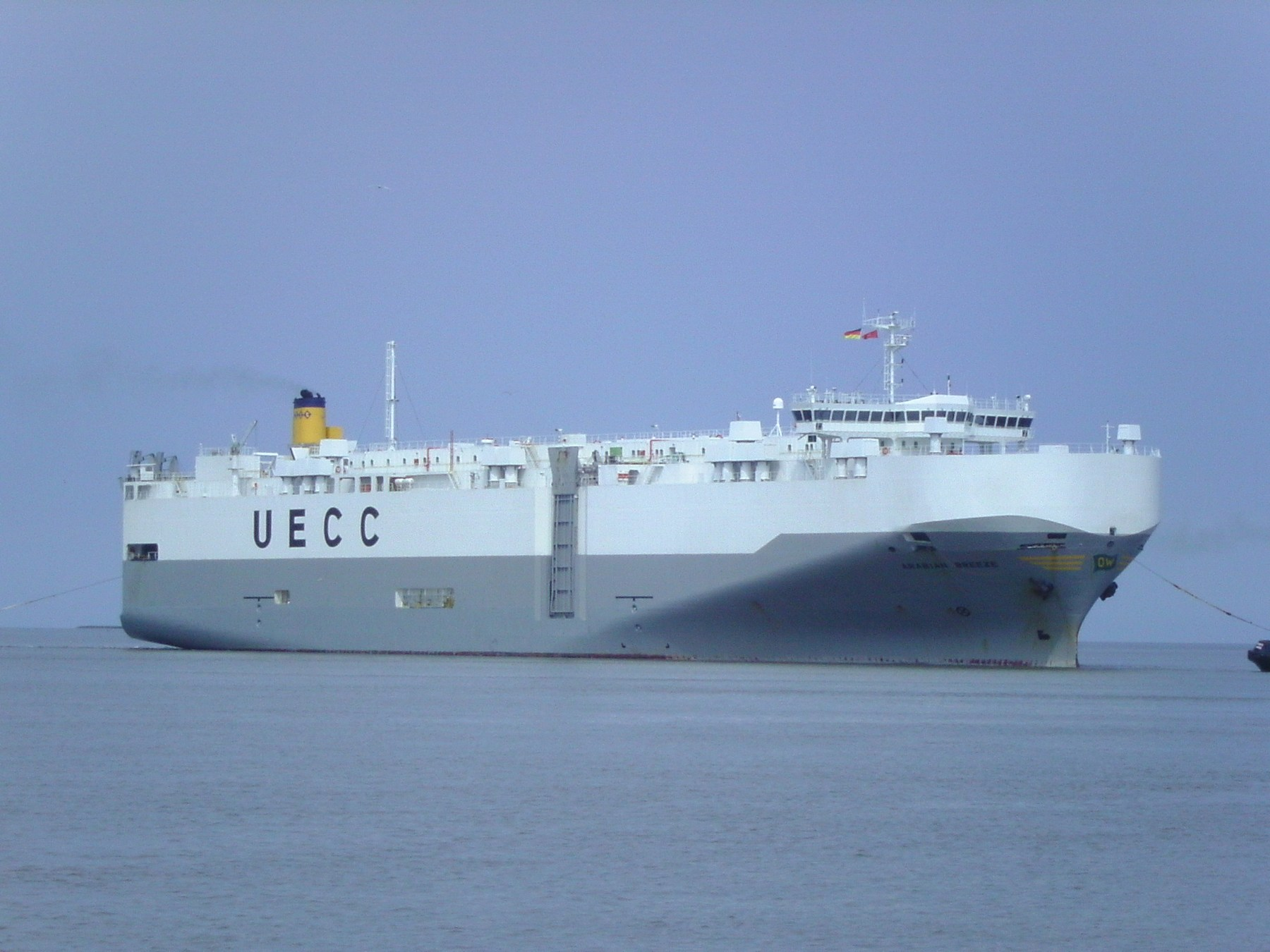
Auto Breeze

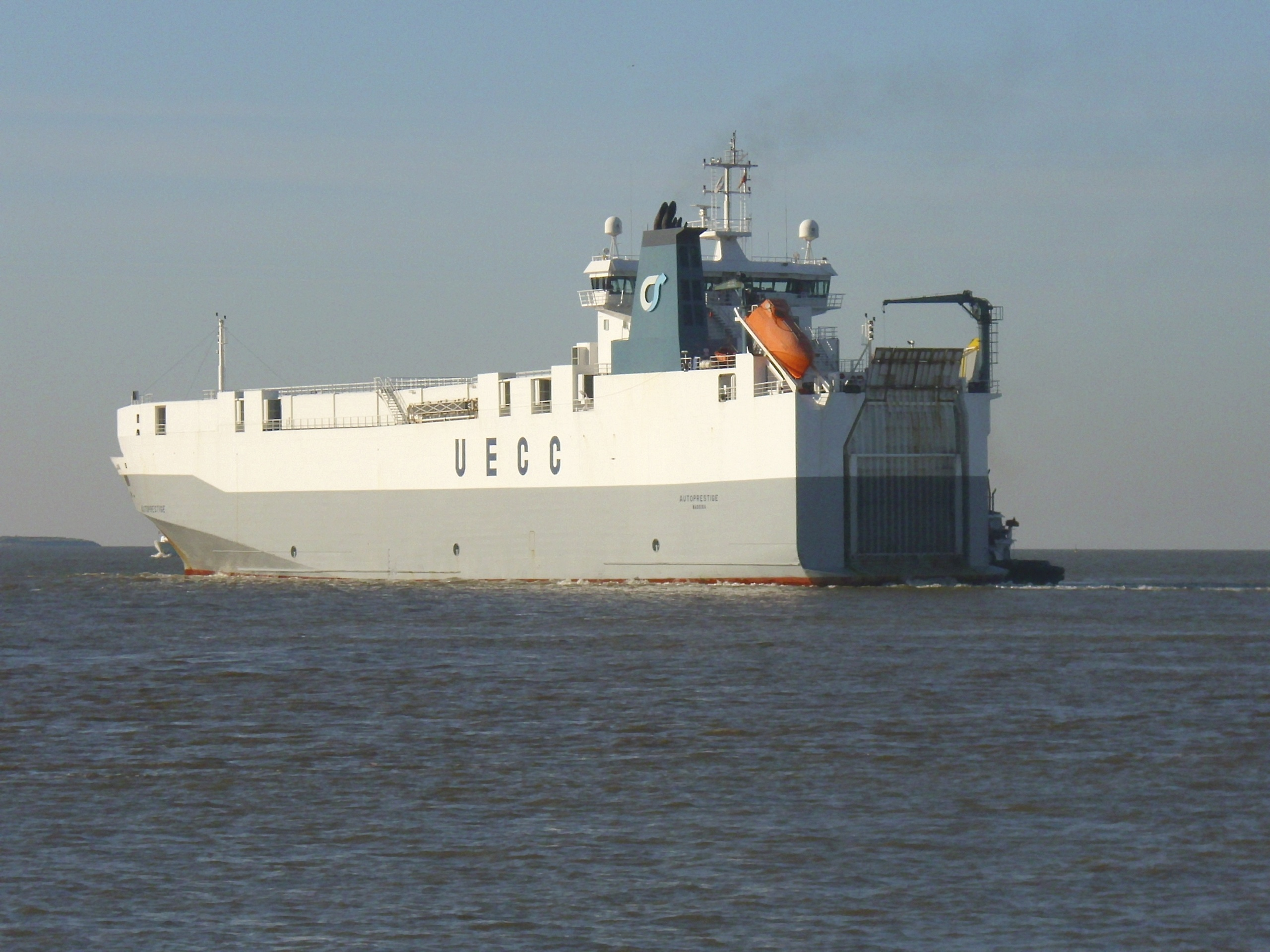
Autoprestige

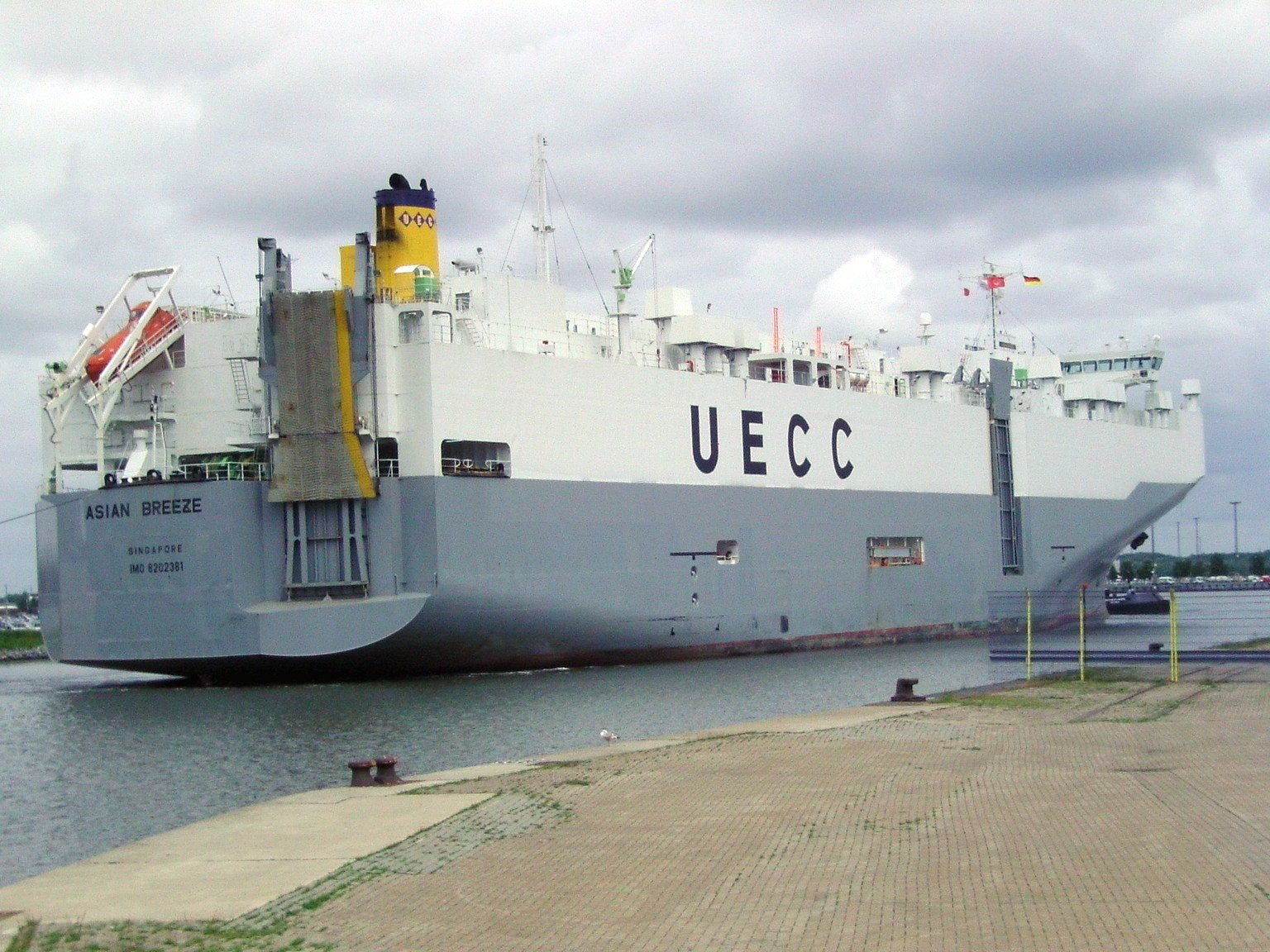
Asian Breeze

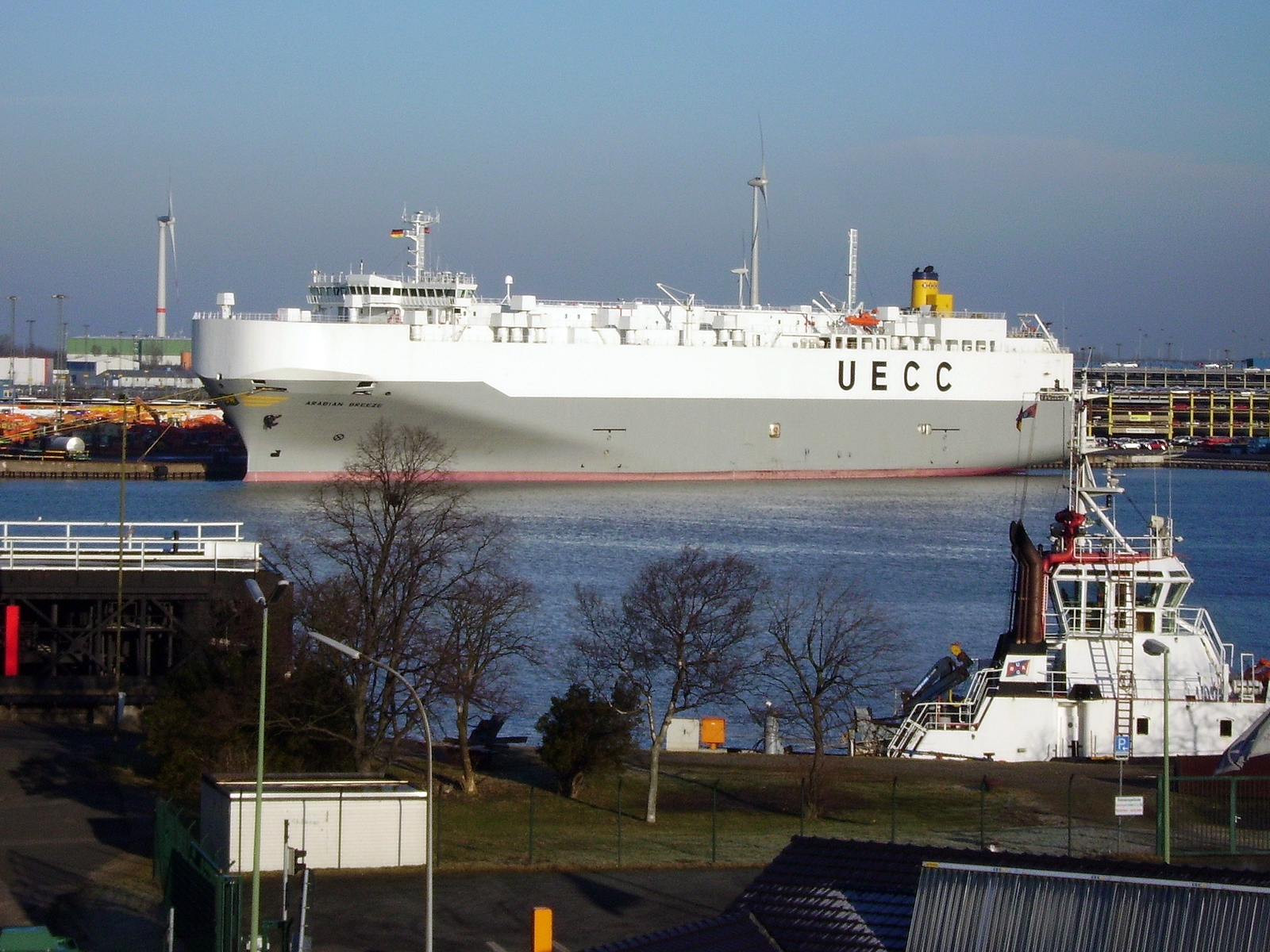
Arabian Breeze

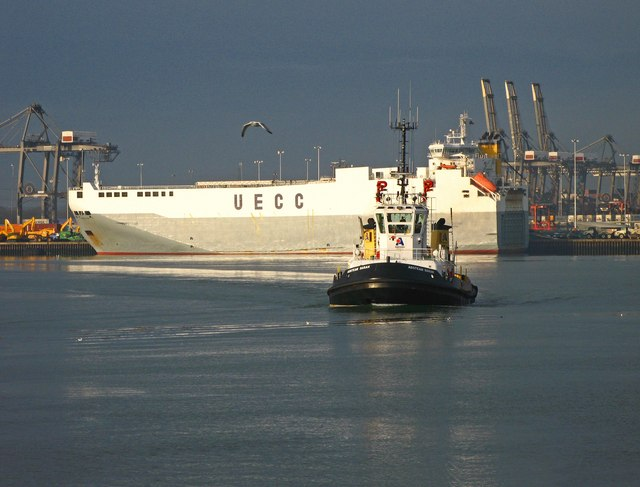
UECC vessel at Southampton

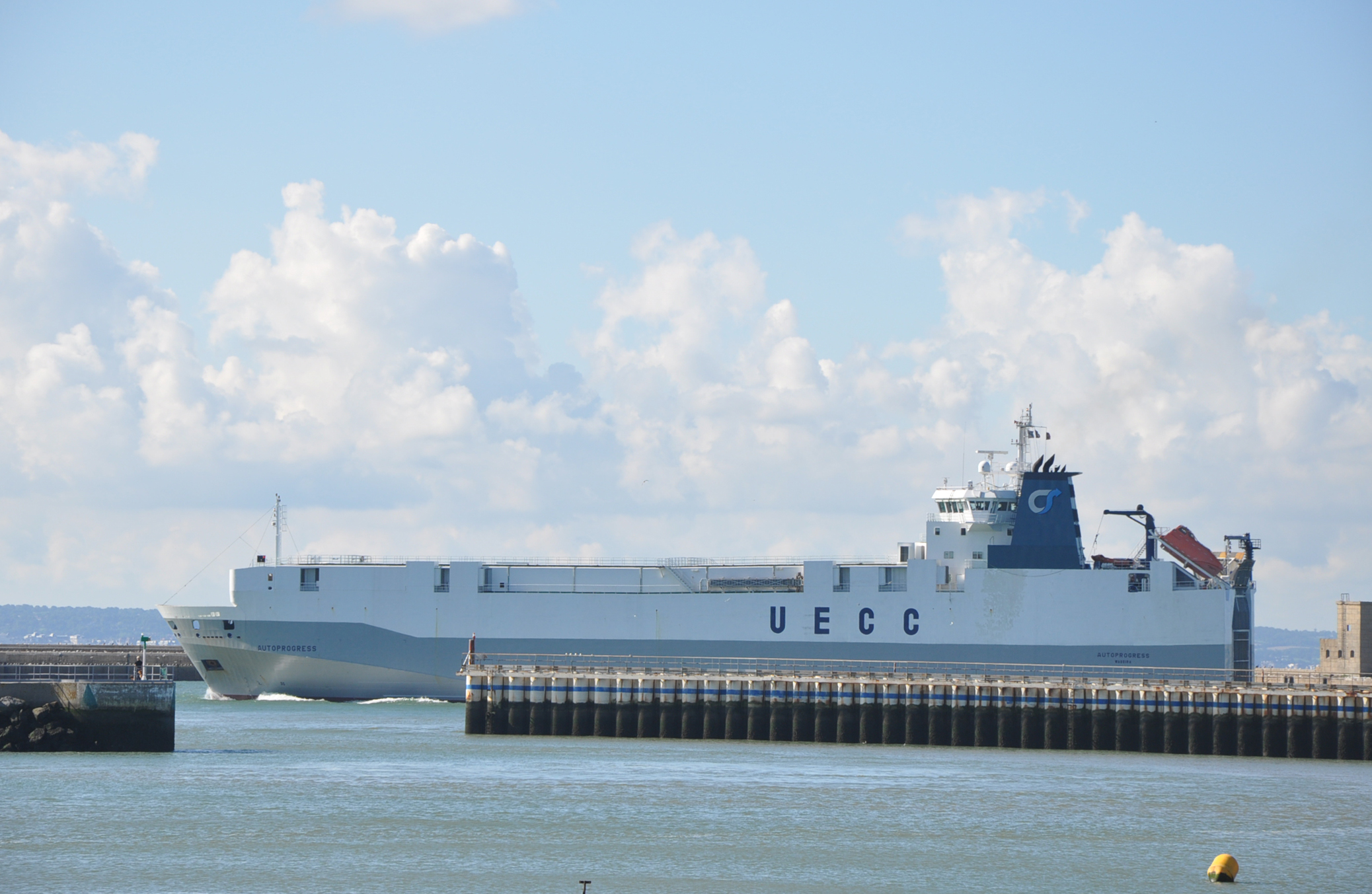
UECC vessel at Le Havre

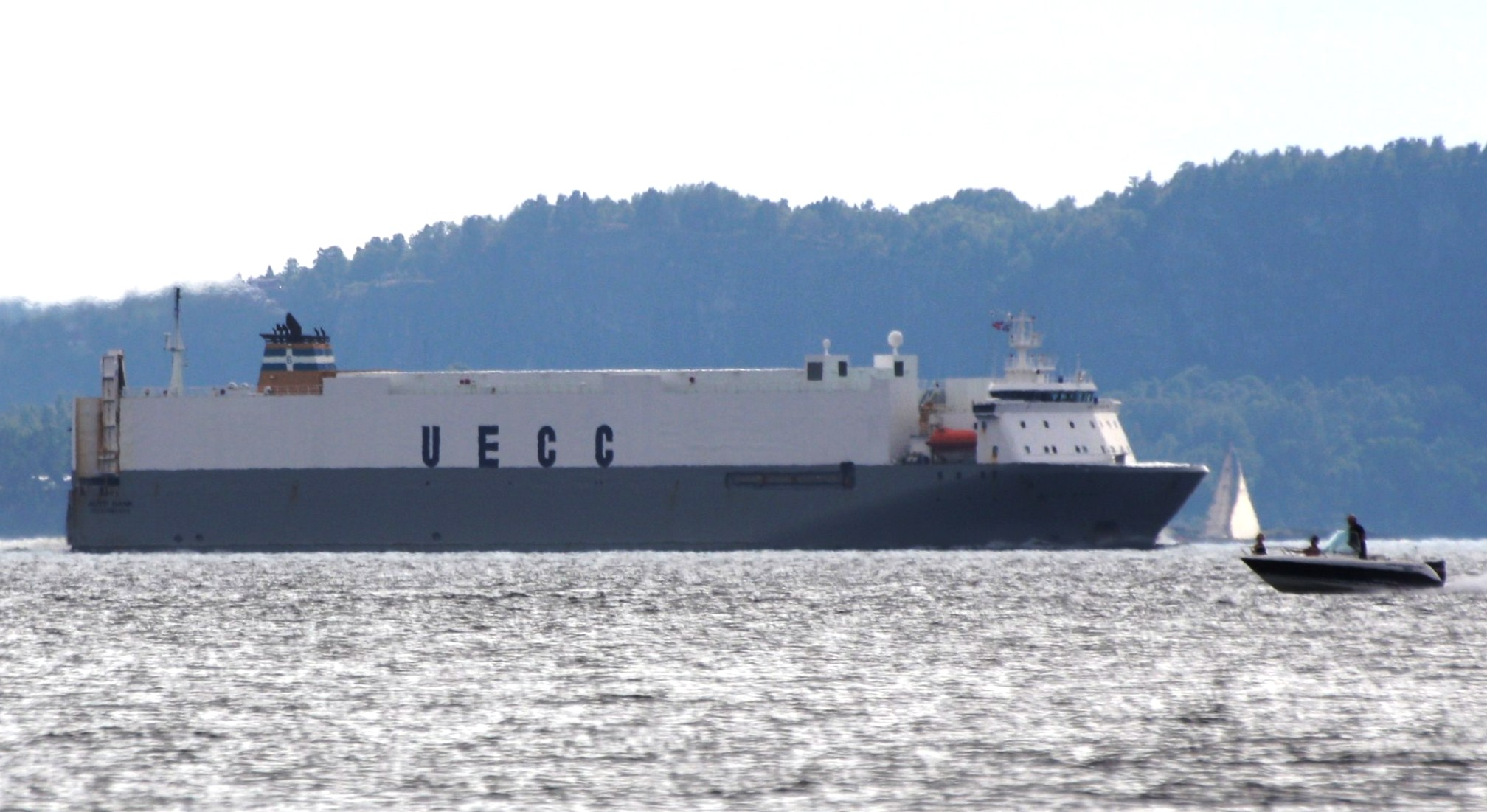
Auto Baltic

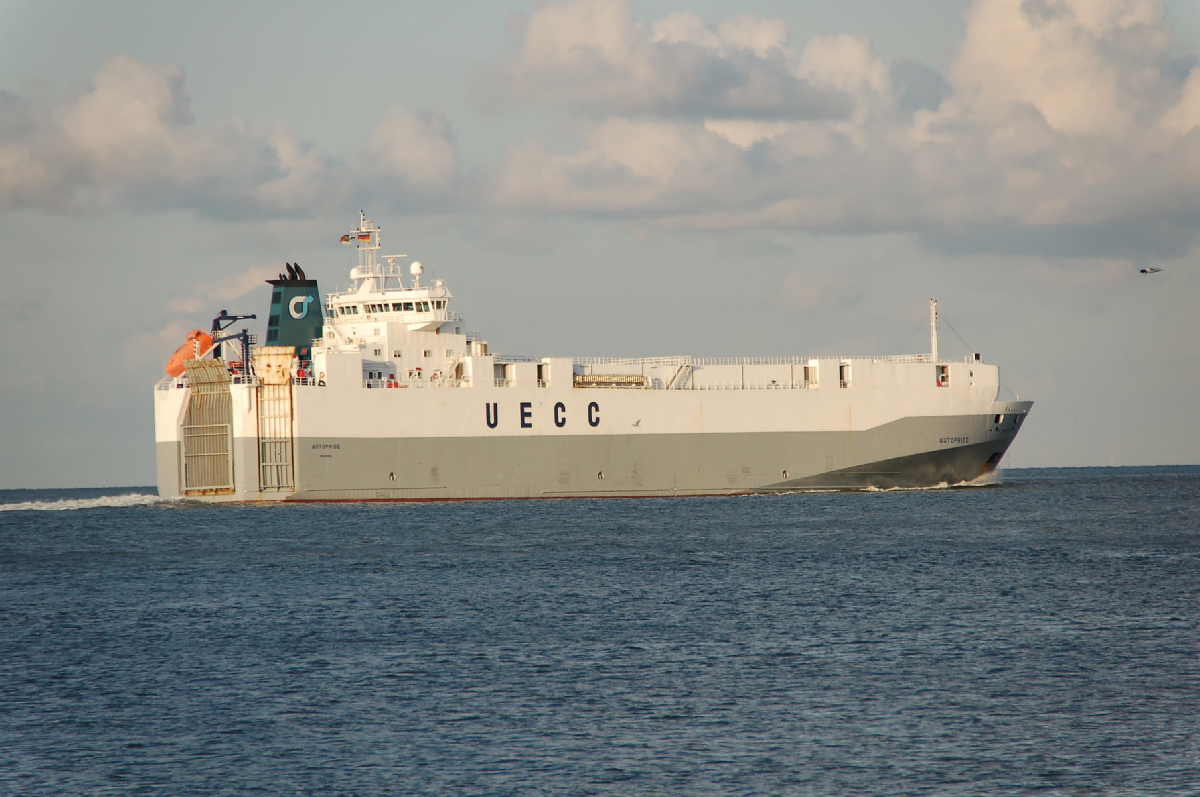
Autopride

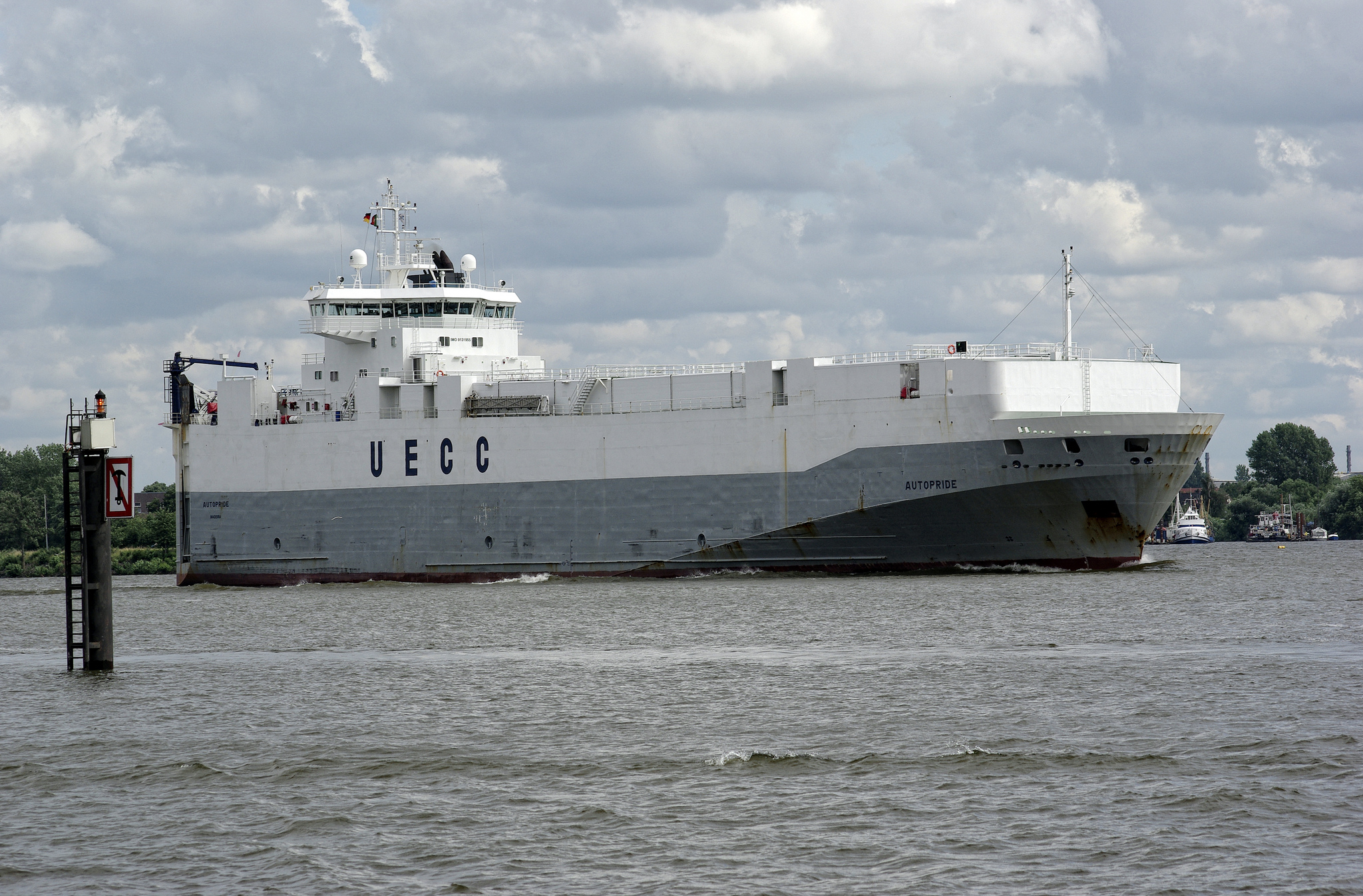
UECC Autopride

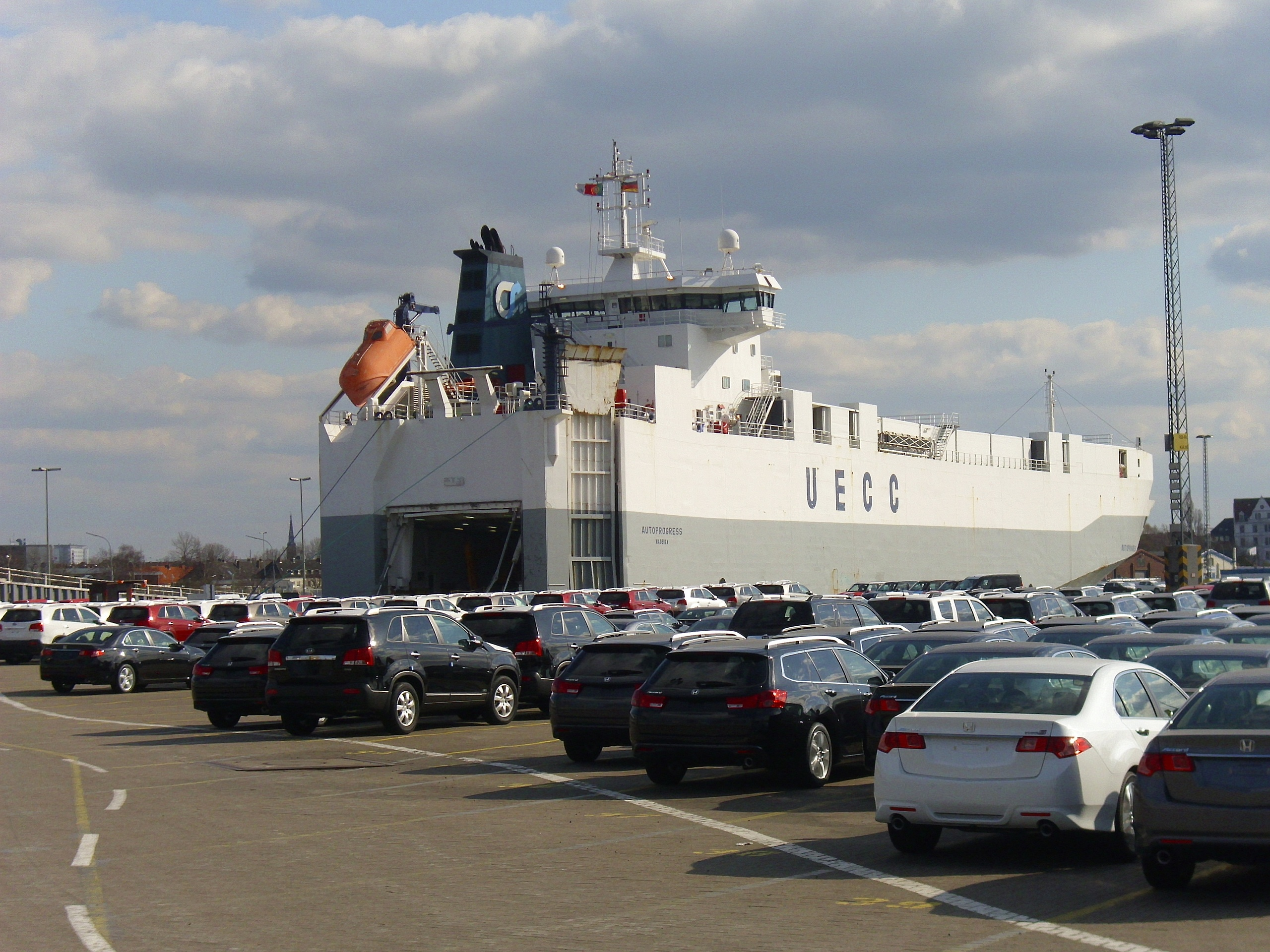
Autoprogress
