= Leif Höegh & Co =

Shipping company

Leif Höegh & Co. Holdings AS

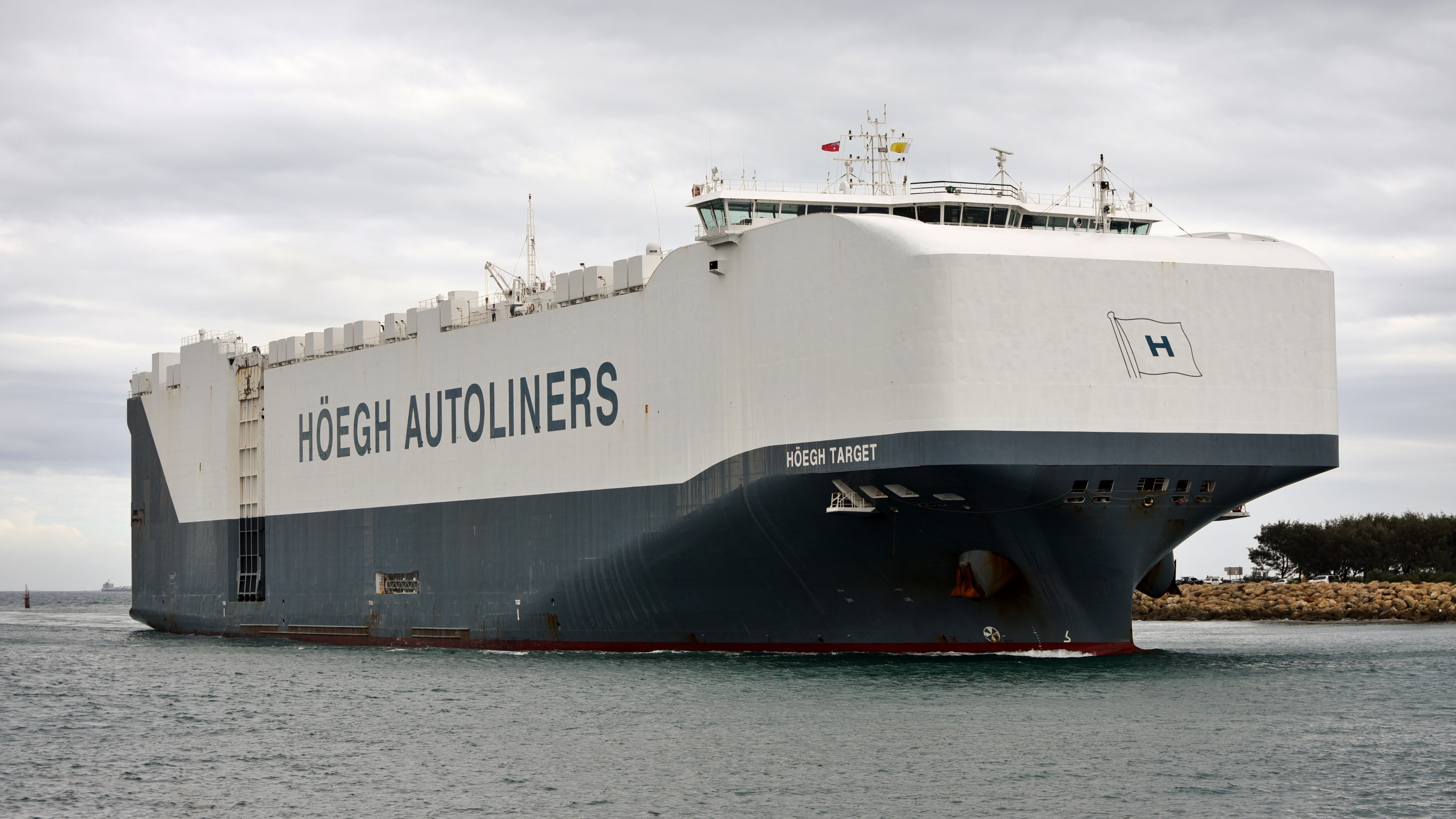
- Type: Public
- Traded as: NYSE: HMLP (Höegh LNG)
- Industry: Shipping
- Founded: 1927
- Headquarters: Norway
- Area served: Worldwide
- Number of employees: 1700
- Website: www.hoegh.com

Leif Höegh & Co is a shipping company founded in 1927 by Norwegian Leif Høegh (1896-1974). Since 2006 the company has been structured as two separate entities, Höegh Autoliners and Höegh LNG, with Leif Höegh & Co acting as a common holding company.

== Höegh LNG division ==
Höegh LNG is active in the liquefied natural gas industry including LNG carriers. As of January 2015, it is 44.6% owned by Leif Höegh. The largest investors are Allianz, Fairview Capital and Nordea. The Baupost Group announced that it controlled 5.26% of shares for its clients.

== Höegh Autoliners ==
Höegh Autoliners operates pure car/truck carrier (PCTC) vessels, and its main business is the maritime transport and distribution of cargo such as automobiles, trucks, trailers, Mafi roll trailers, heavy construction machinery and further types of rolling freight.

In 1970 a joint venture in between Höegh and Ugland Auto Liners (HUAL) was formed to develop a new leading RORO operator. In the beginning, some passenger ships of Royal Mail Line were converted into car carriers like the Arlanza, becoming Höegh Trotter (formerly Hual Trotter).

Then in March 2000 Leif Höegh & Co acquired the remaining 50% of HUAL, renaming the company Höegh Autoliners, as known today.

In 2008 A.P. Moller became a minority shareholder in Höegh Autoliners, holding 37.5% of shares.

As part of its relationship with Maersk, Höegh Autoliners took over twelve Maersk ships in 2008 (plus the contract of six to be built).

Since January 2014, its Europe/USA routes have included Valencia to Baltimore, Jacksonville, New York and Galveston.

Until December 2019 sale, the company used to also have a 50% stake in Euro Marine Logistics, dedicated to short sea destinations.

Since 2005, a subdivision (Alliance Navigation LLC) was created to provide regular services via three US flagged ships, for cargo and military equipment requiring carriage under American flag.

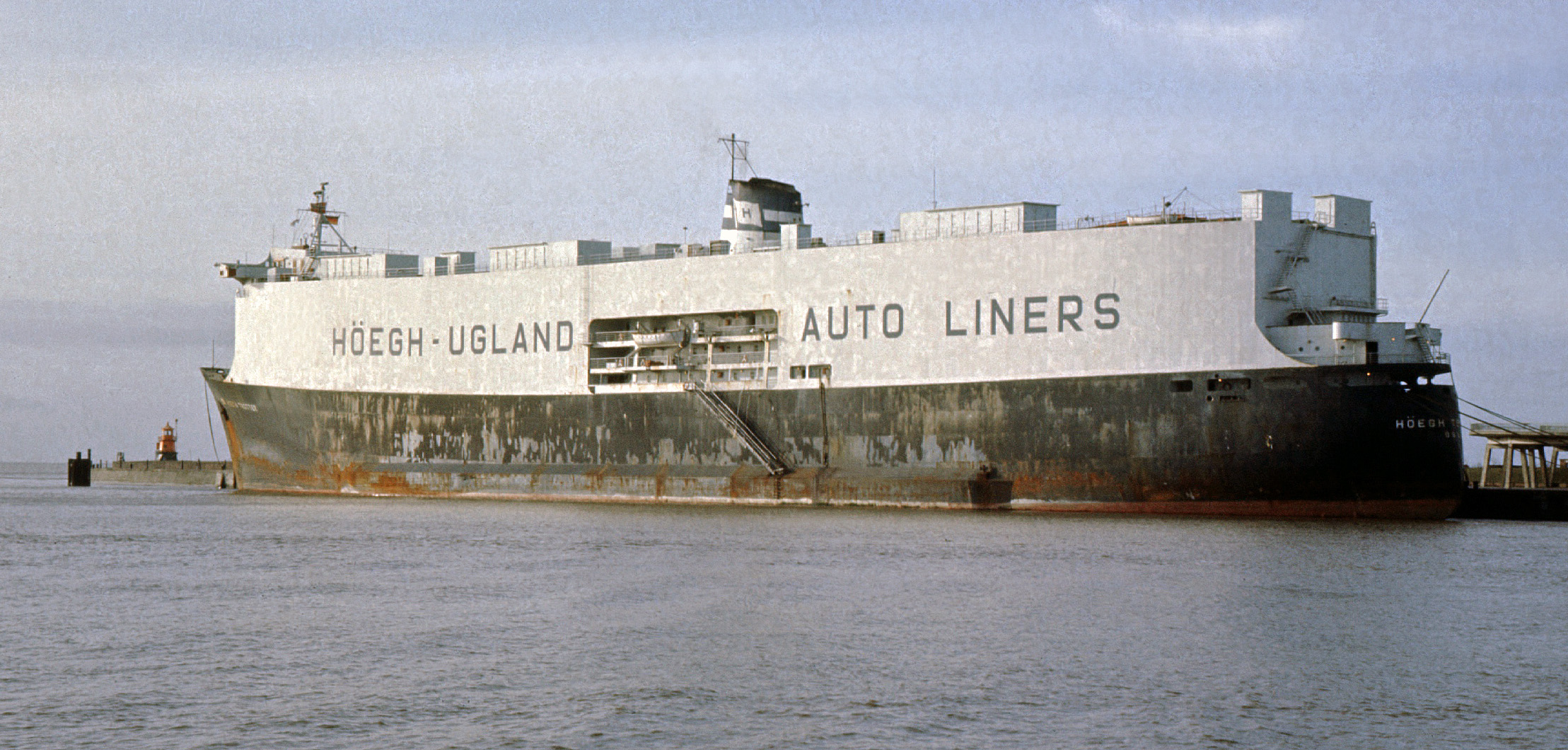
Höegh Trotter in Emden in 1976

== Facts and accidents ==
In May 2014, it was announced that nine Höegh Autoliners PCTC vessels would be managed by Wallem which would deliver technical and crew management from Wallem's Singapore base.

In January 2015, the Höegh Osaka was en route from Southampton to Bremerhaven when it accidentally grounded, requiring salvage.

On 25 February 2019, MV Höegh London reported a crew member casualty while sailing in the Mediterranean Sea from Tanger-Med to Gemlik. The vessel faced an extremely serious storm, that caused severe rolling and consequent unexpected movements of her cargo on the decks. Several vehicles were damaged, and also the bulkhead structure was cracked in several points, with seawater entering in her holds. While the crew was verifying the seriousness of the damages and attempting the cargo re-lashing, a Chinese crew member was hit by heavy machinery, reporting life threatening injuries and soon after died on board. The ship requested emergency berthing at Pozzallo port to disembark the seafarer, and undertake an inspection of the ship’s seaworthiness.

On 4 June 2020, a serious fire started on MV Höegh Xiamen while alongside Jacksonville Blount Island port: it burned for three full days, before being successfully extinguished by the Jacksonville Fire and Rescue Department. The vessel had been on a regular monthly service between Europe and US, under Grimaldi Group chartering and operation, transporting cars and used high and heavy machineries, but was eventually declared a total loss.

On 17 July 2020, MV Höegh London collided with a South Korean navy submarine after departing Masan port, in the direction of its next port of call in China. Both carriers reported minor damage and gashes that required thorough inspections.

== Ships gallery ==
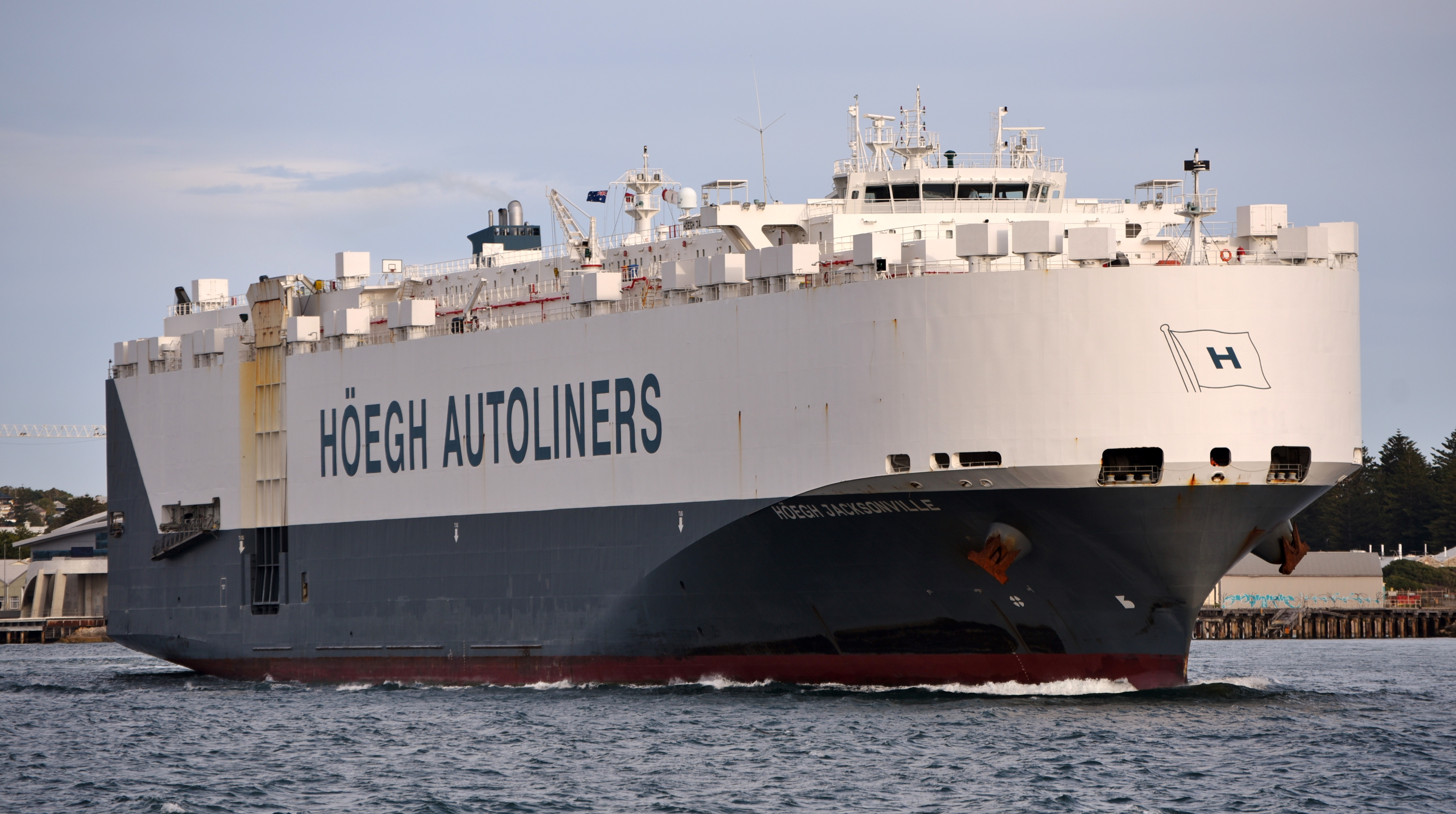
Höegh Jacksonville

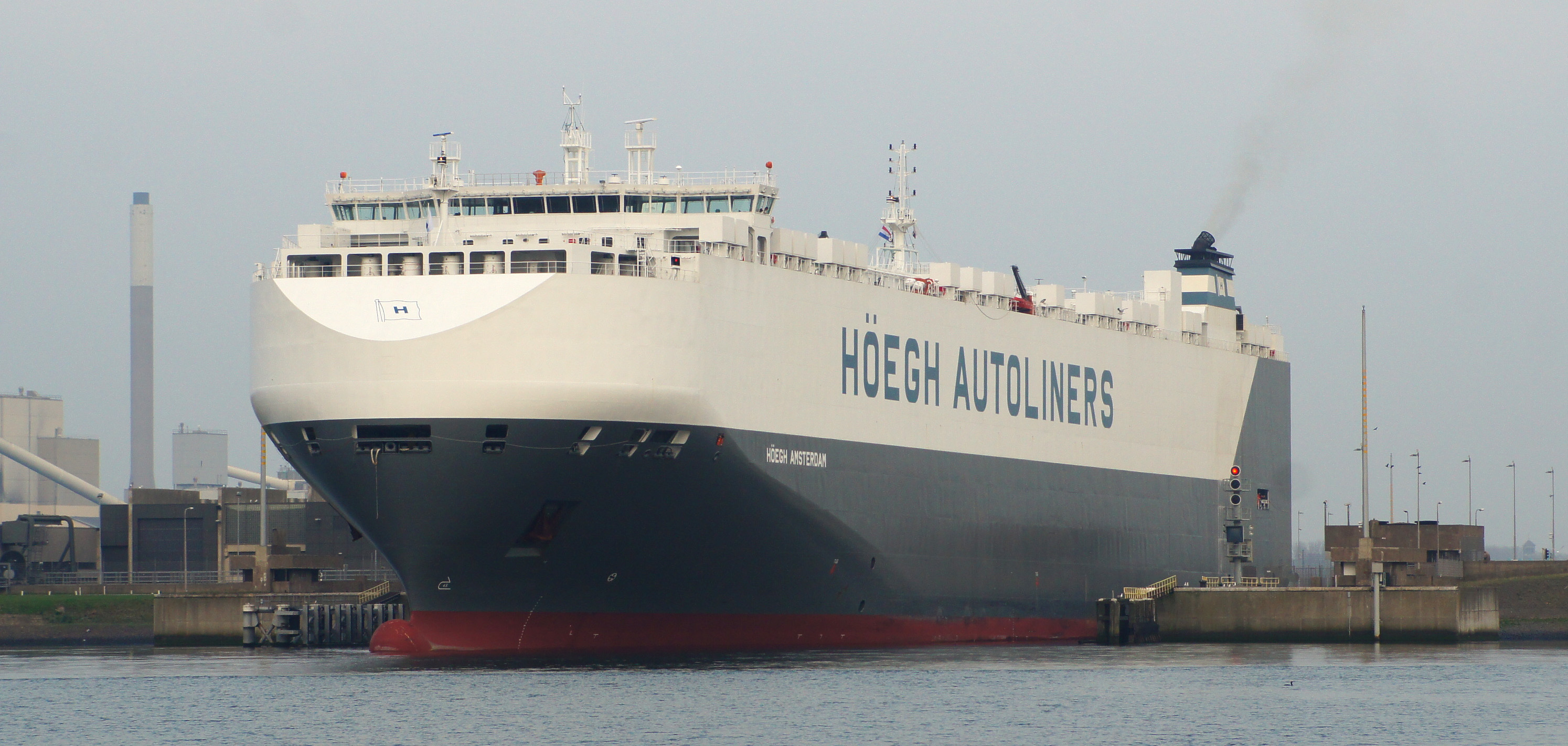
Höegh Amsterdam

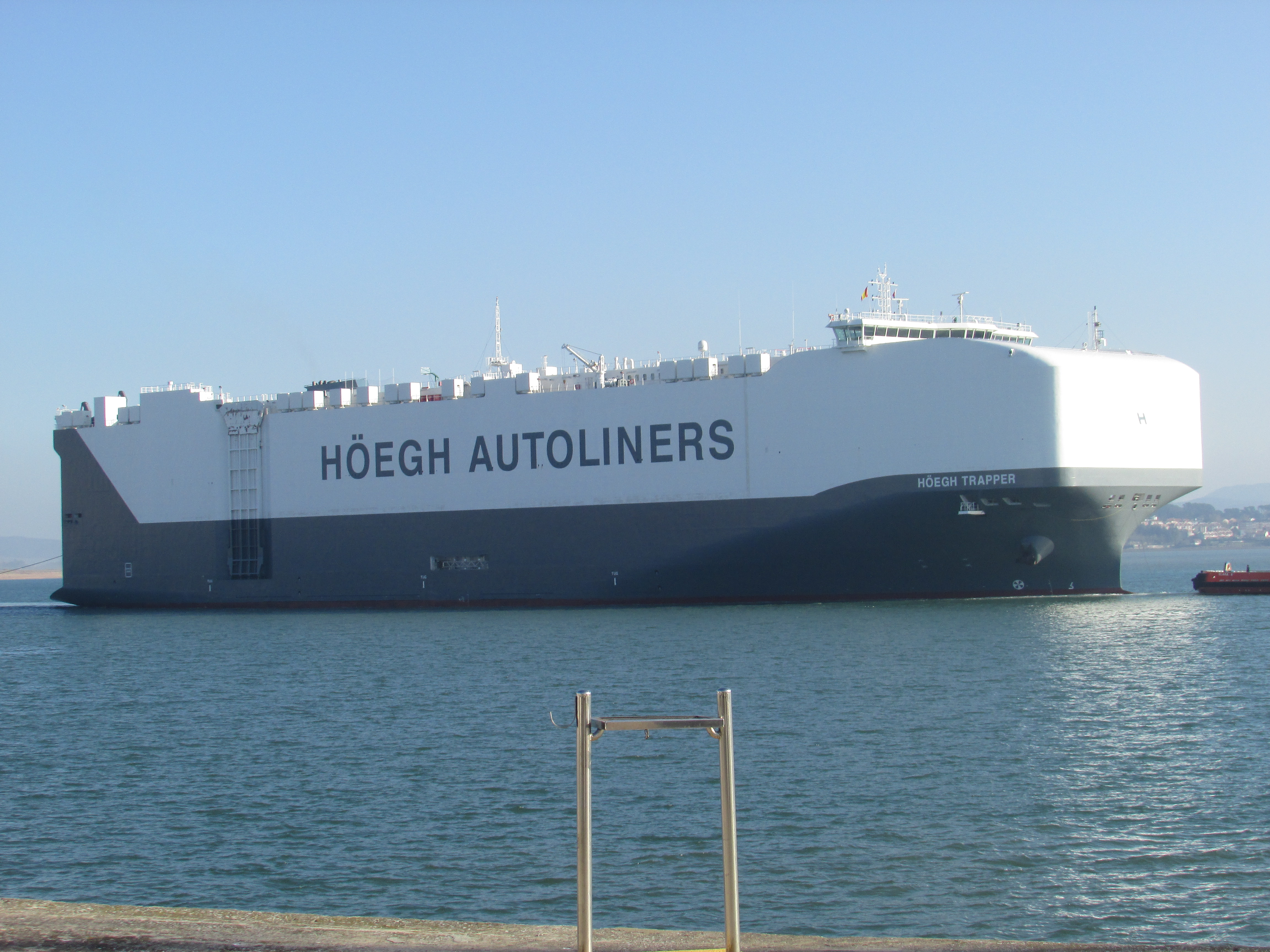
Höegh Trapper

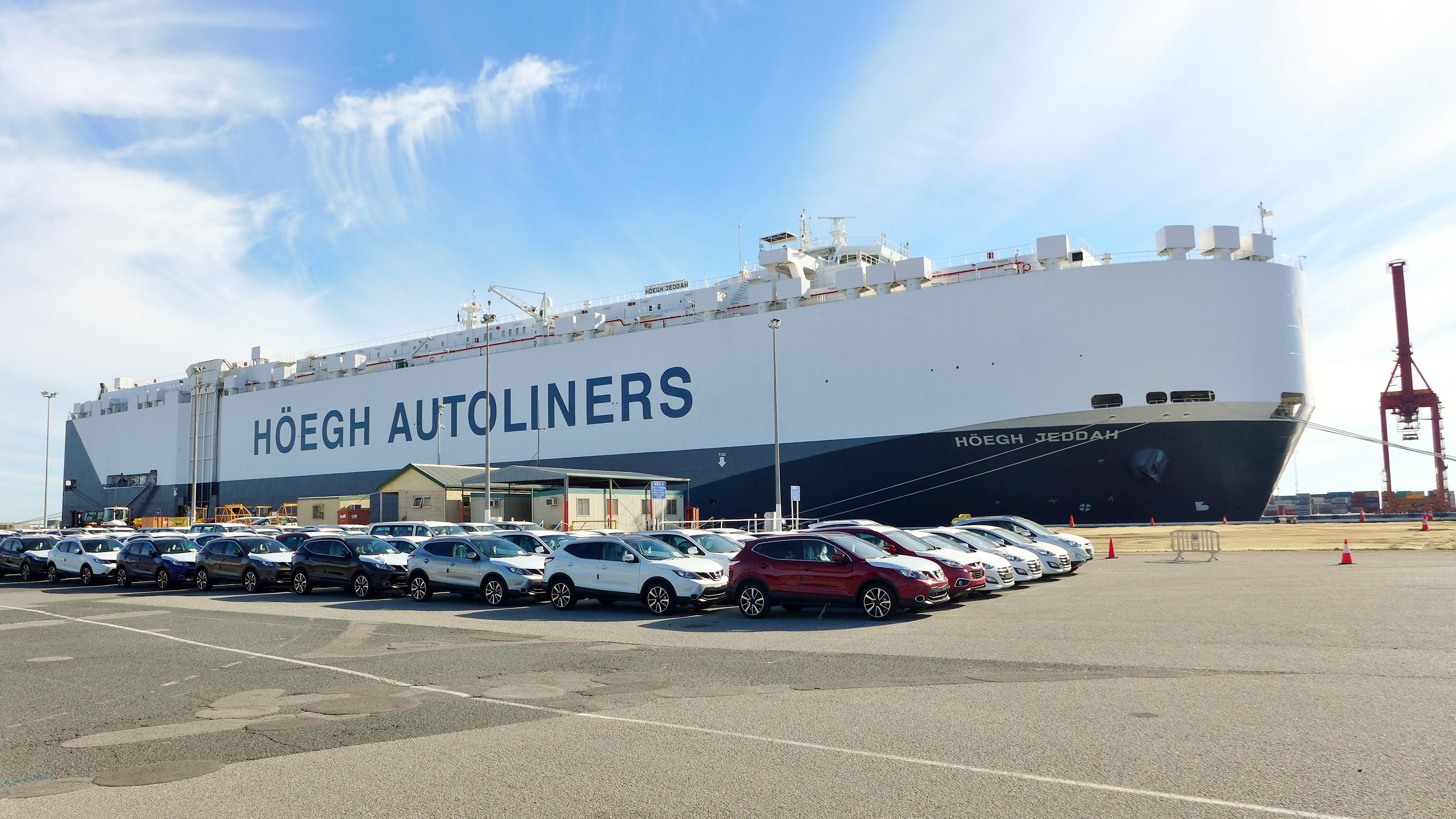
Höegh Jeddah

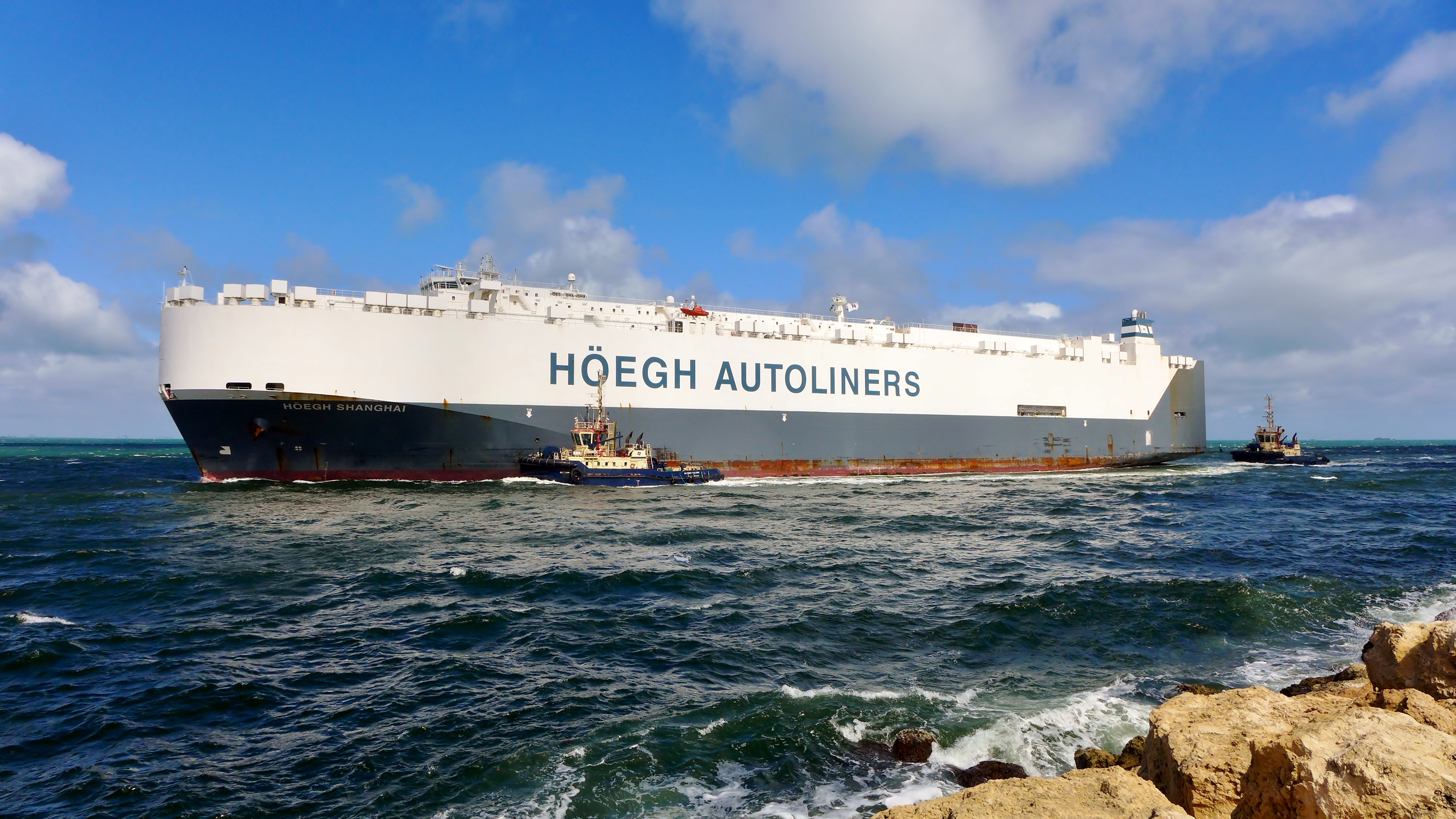
Höegh Shanghai

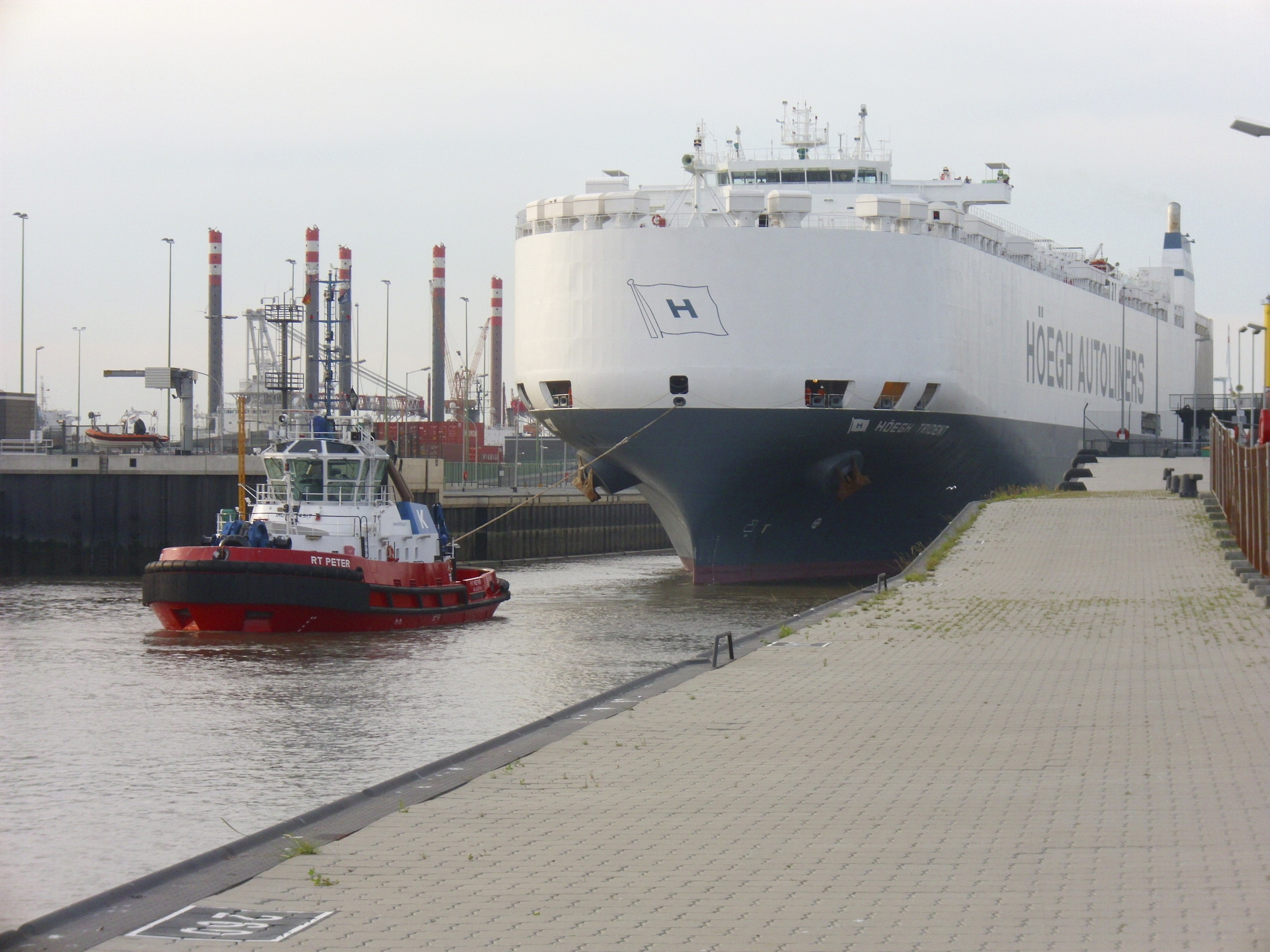
Höegh Trident

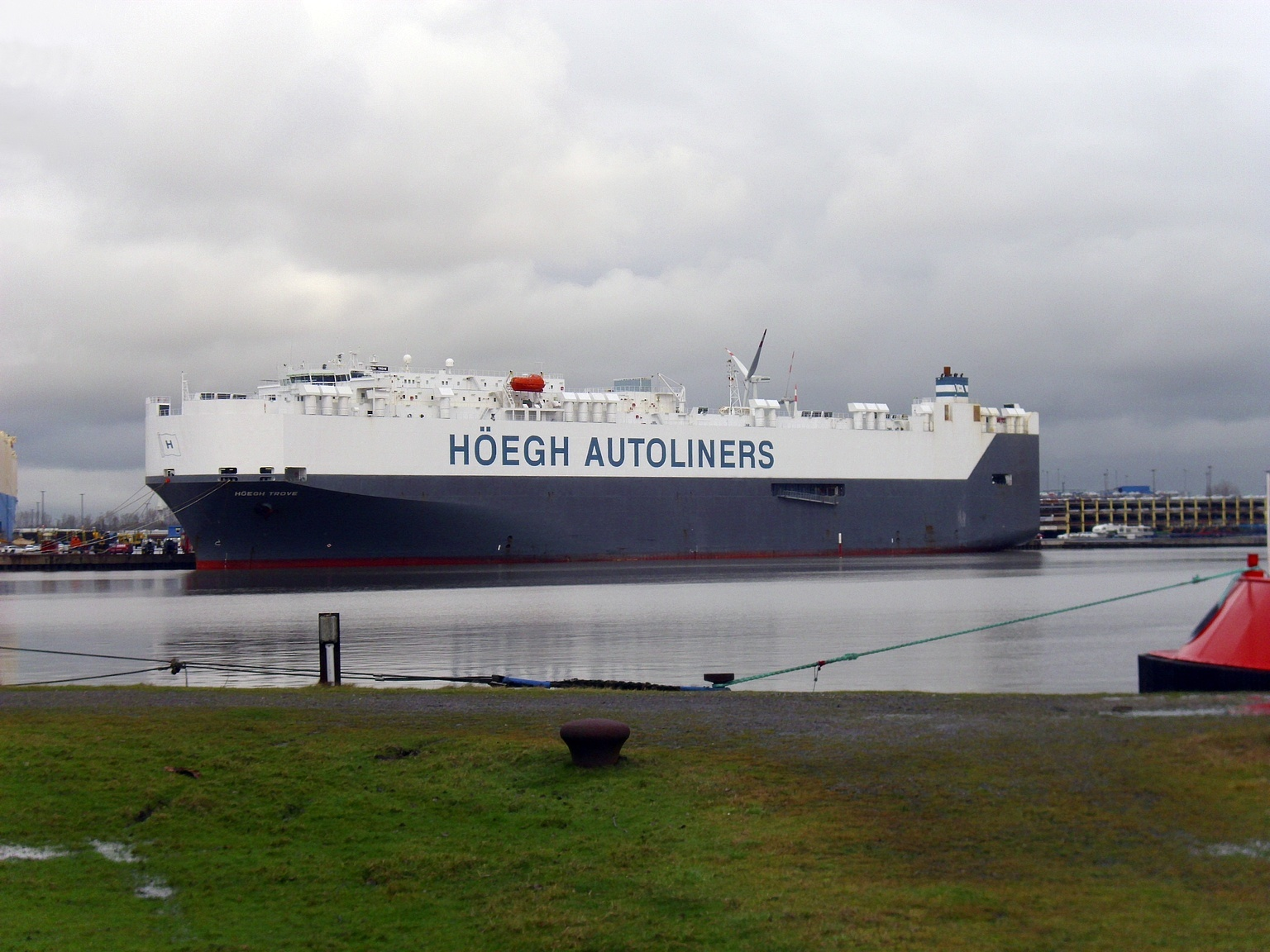
Höegh Trove

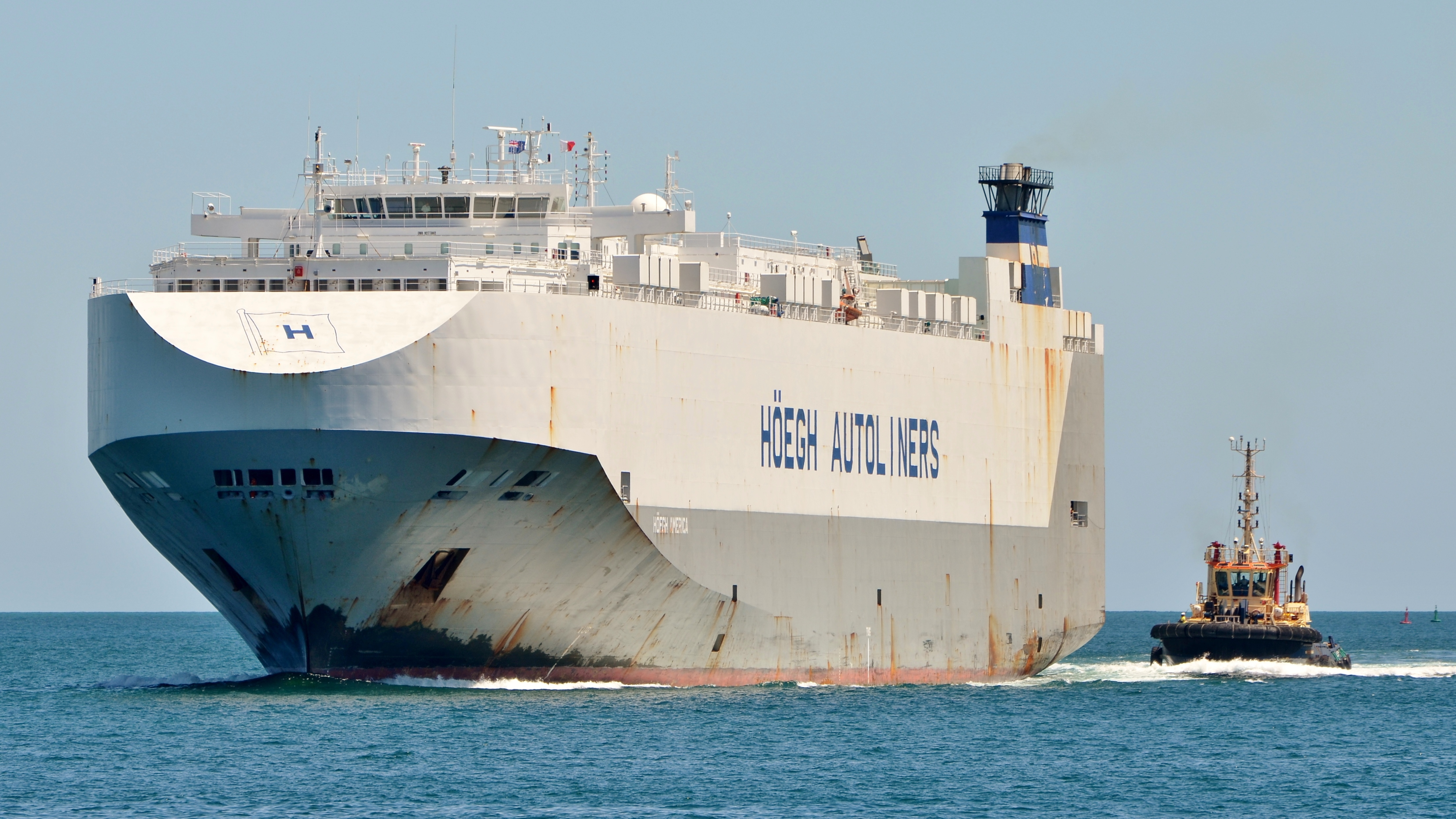
Höegh America

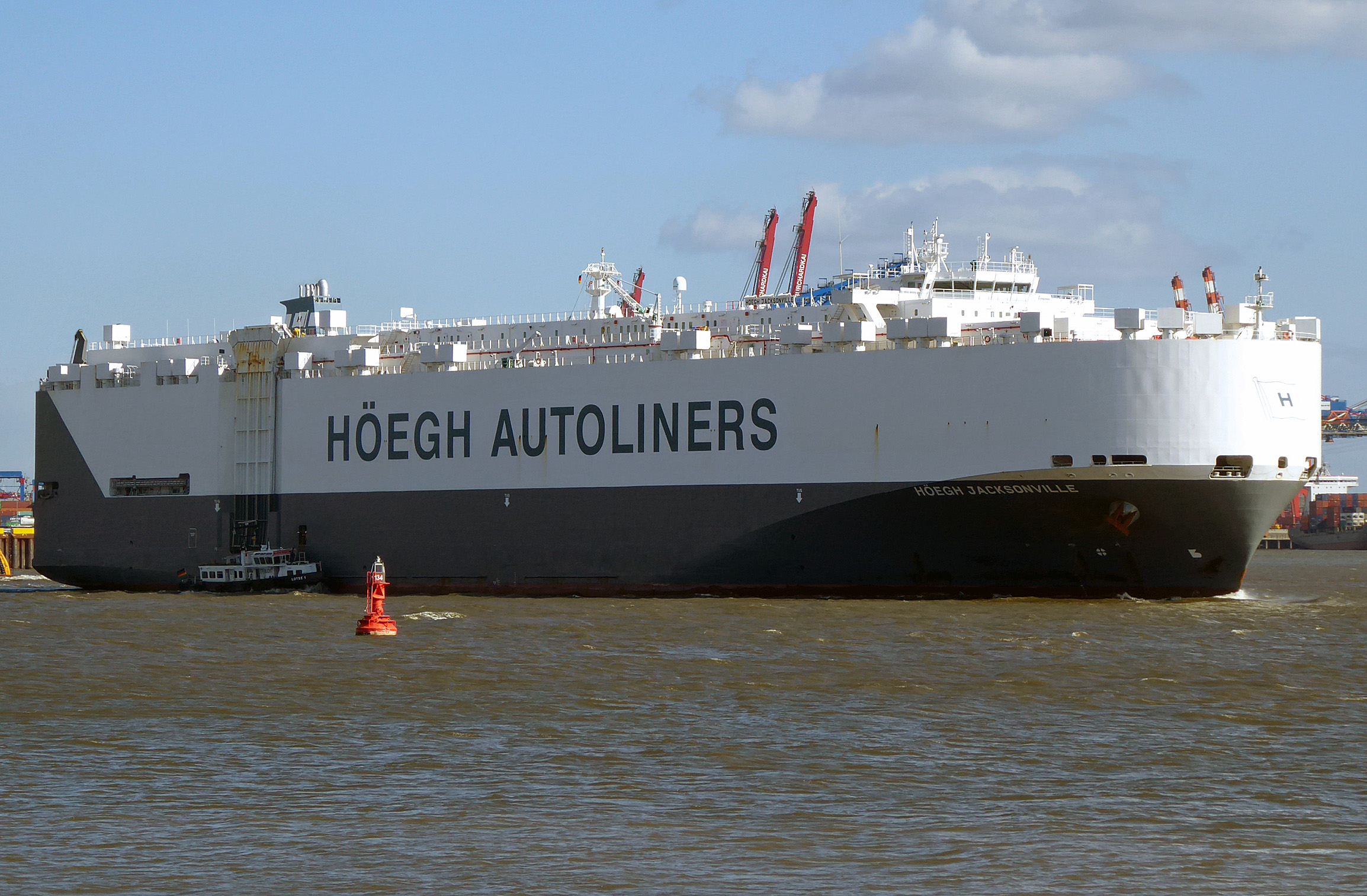
Höegh Jacksonville

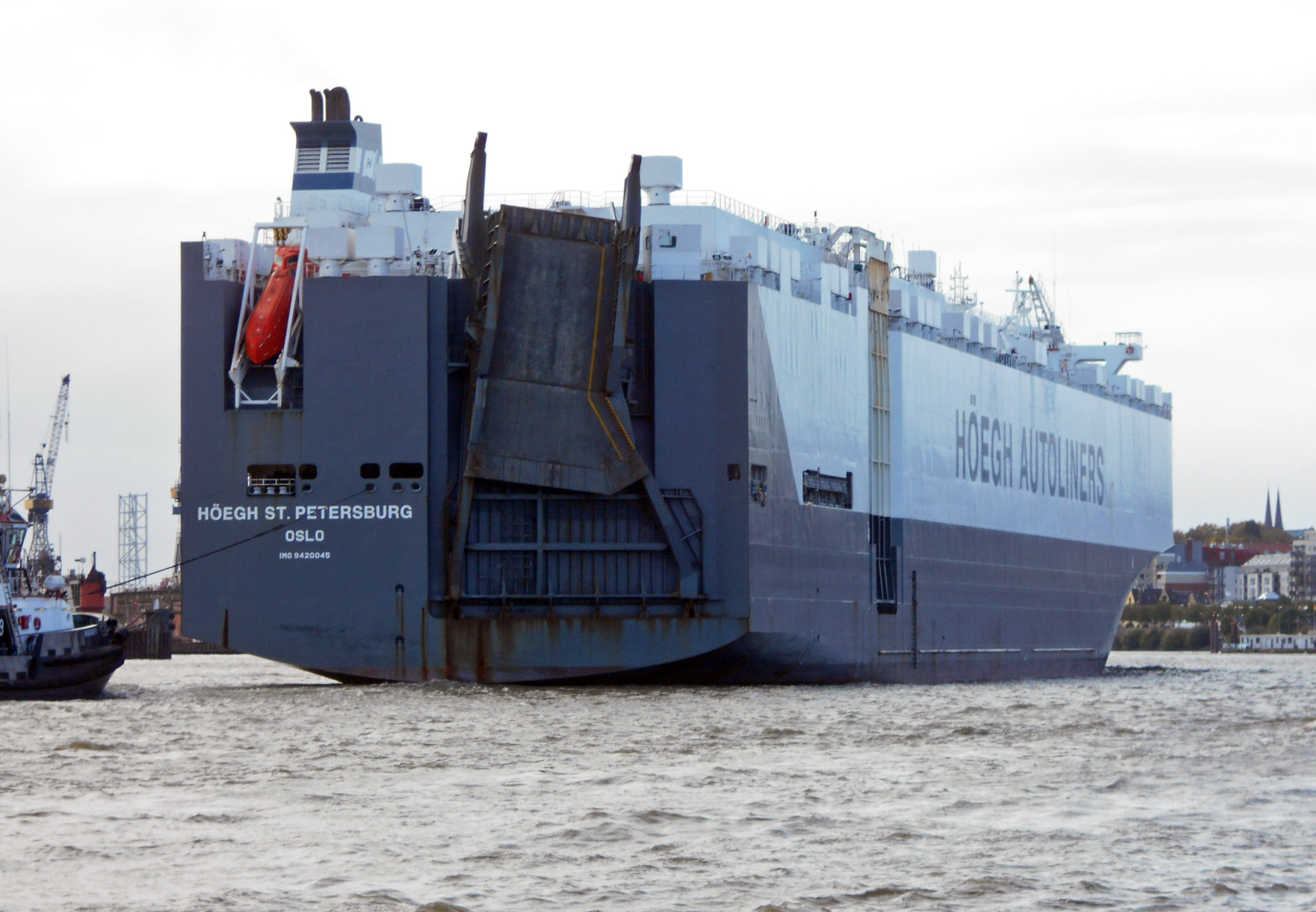
Höegh St. Petersburg

== Maersk PCTC fleet acquisition ==
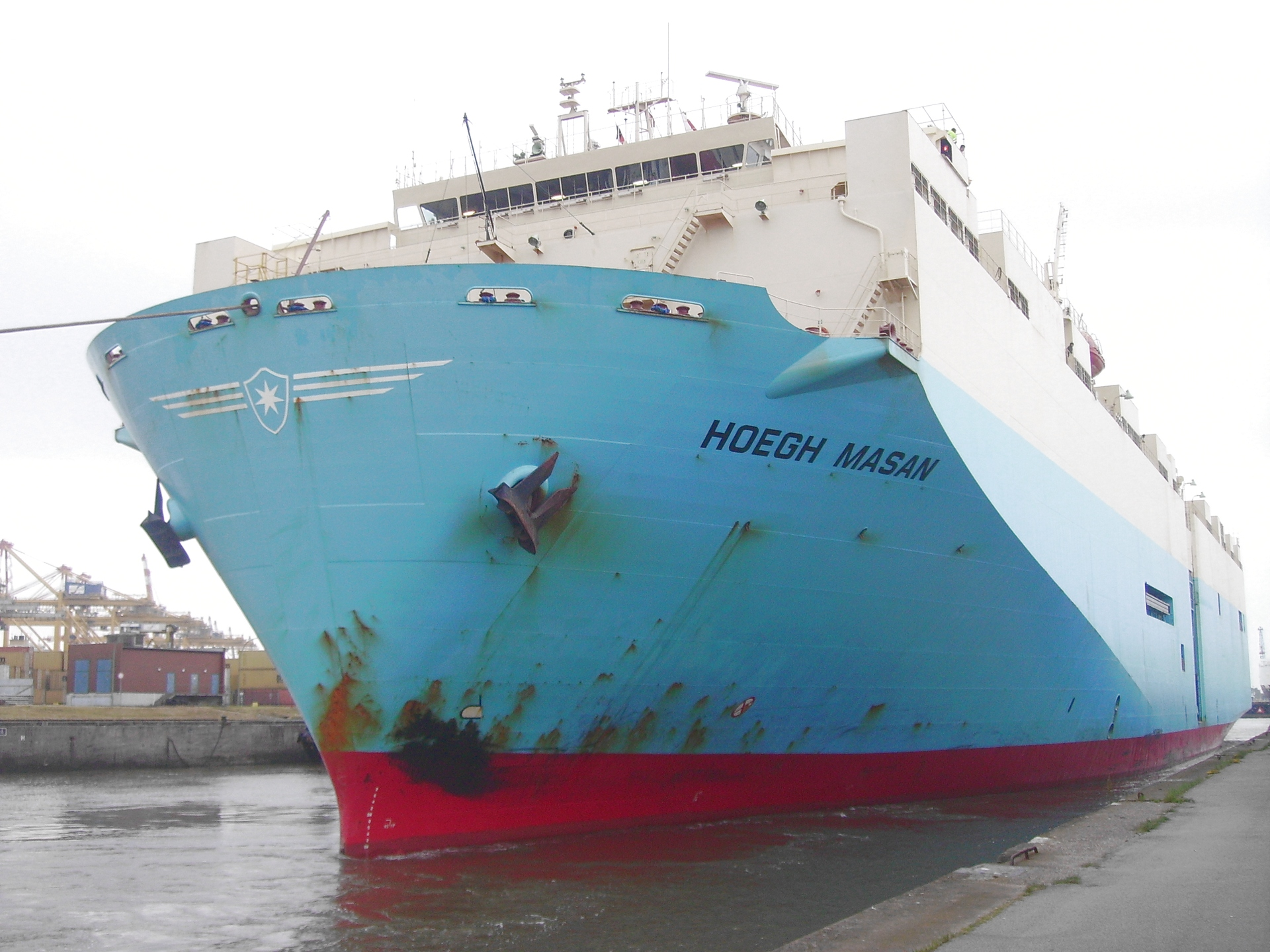
Höegh Masan

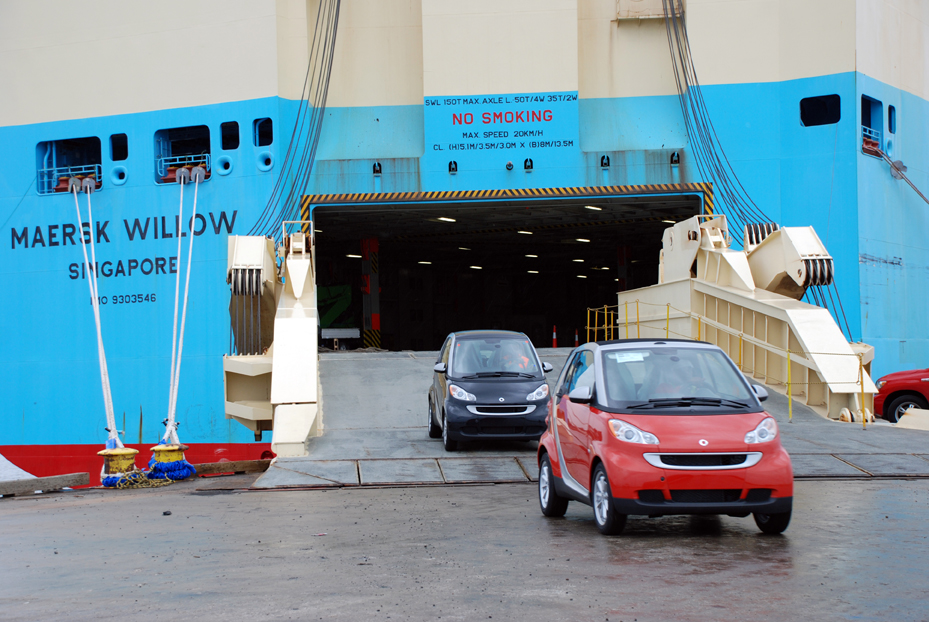
Maersk Willow

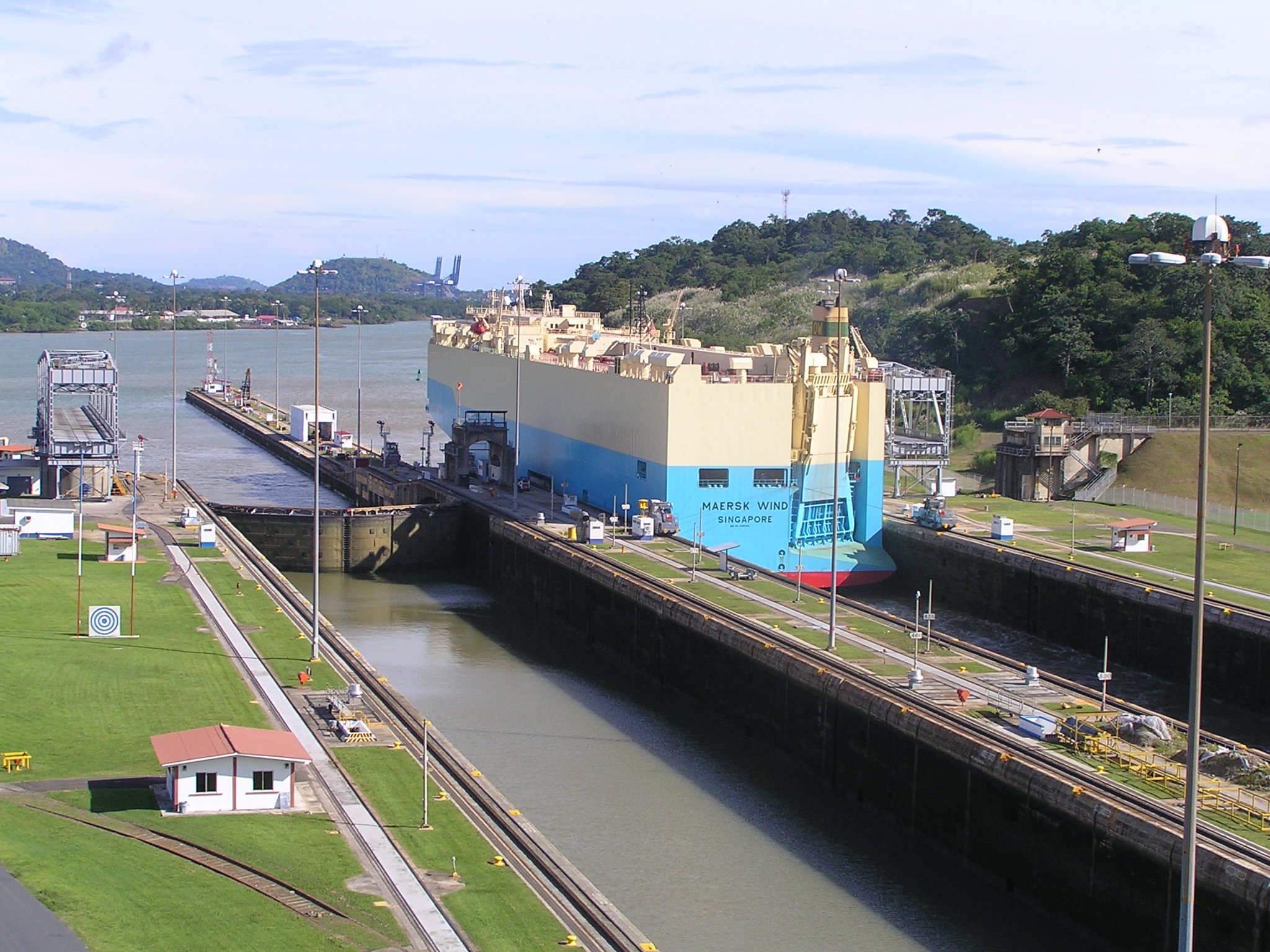
Maersk Wind

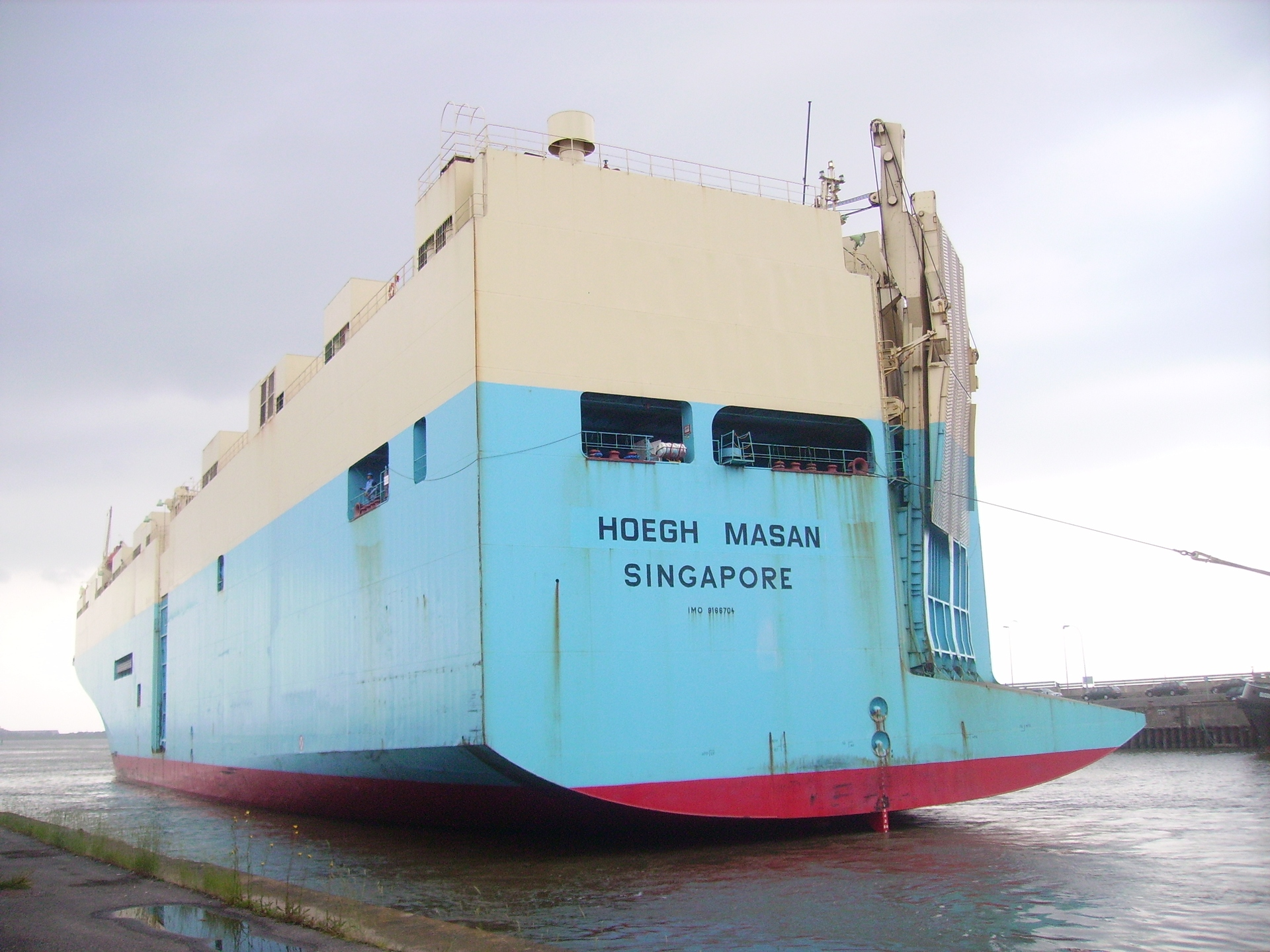
Höegh Masan at berth

MAERSK NAME	HÖEGH NAME	FUNNEL - MAERSK CHARTER TO
Maersk Cloud	Höegh Cochin	MOL
Maersk Sea	Höegh Chennai	MOL
Maersk Sun	Höegh Mumbai	MOL
Maersk Taiki	Höegh Pusan	NYK
Maersk Taiyo	Höegh Kunsan	NYK
Maersk Teal	Höegh Masan	WWL
Maersk Tide	Höegh Incheon	NYK
Maersk Wave	Höegh Yokohama	WWL
Maersk Welkin	Höegh Chiba	NYK
Maersk Willow	Höegh Kyoto	MOL
Maersk Wind	Höegh Osaka	WWL
Maersk Wizard	Höegh Kobe	NYK

Maersk Crest (ex mv Rich Queen) was sold to NYK in 2007, and renamed Tigris Leader.

== See also ==
- List of roll-on/roll-off vessel accidents
- Euro Marine Logistics – Shipping and logistics company
- American Roll-on Roll-off Carrier
- Siem Shipping – Norwegian shipping company
- Messina Line – Italian shipping line
- Nippon Yusen Kaisha – Japanese shipping line
