= Cougar Ace =

Car-carrier ship that wrecked in 2006

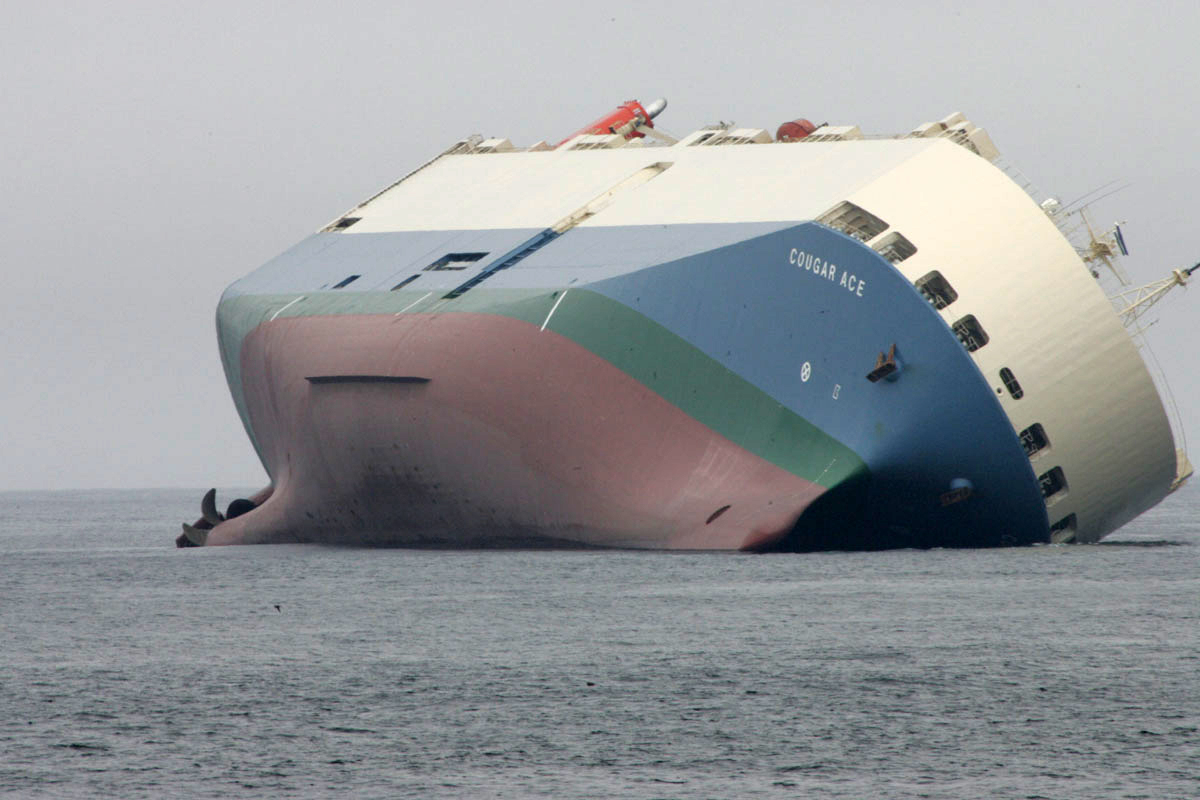
- Cougar Ace listing to port, view towards bow end

History
- Name: Cougar Ace
- Owner: Mitsui OSK Lines
- Port of registry: Singapore Singapore
- Builder: K.K. Kanasashi, Toyohashi, Japan
- Cost: $100-million+
- Yard number: 3305
- Launched: 30 June 1993
- Completed: October 1993
- Out of service: May 2020
- Identification: IMO number: 9051375; Callsign 9VKE
- Fate: Scrapped 19 June 2020

General characteristics
- Class & type: Roll On-Roll Off car carrier
- Tonnage: 55,328 GT; 18,922 DWT
- Length: 199 m (652 ft 11 in)
- Beam: 32.26 m (105 ft 10 in)
- Draught: 9.72 m (31 ft 11 in)
- Propulsion: Mitsubishi
- Speed: 18.6 knots (34.4 km/h; 21.4 mph)
- Capacity: 5,542 automobiles

Cougar Ace was a Singapore-flagged roll-on/roll-off car carrier vessel. The Cougar Ace was built by Kanasashi Co., of Toyohashi, Japan and launched in June 1993. Specifications cite a length of 199m, draft of 9.72m, beam of 32.26m and a maximum speed of 18.6 knots (34.4 km/h; 21.4 mph). Her Gross Tonnage is 55,328. She is owned by Mitsui O.S.K. Lines.

On 4 May 2005, Cougar Ace delivered 5,214 automobiles at the Fraser River wharves in Richmond, British Columbia. This set a Canadian record for the most vehicles offloaded from a single ship.

== Loss of stability incident ==
On 23 July 2006, she was en route from Japan to Vancouver, British Columbia; Tacoma, Washington; and Port Hueneme, California, with a cargo of 4,812 vehicles. During an exchange of ballast water south of the Aleutian Islands, she lost stability and developed a 60° list to port. There were reports of a large wave striking the vessel during the ballast transfer, but it is unknown what effect this had on her loss of stability. On 24 July, the United States Coast Guard and the 176th Wing of the Alaska Air National Guard successfully rescued the 23 crew members.

4,703 (97.7%) of the vehicles on board were from Mazda; 60% were 2007 Mazda3s and 30% were Mazda CX-7s. The remaining Mazdas were mainly RX-8 and MX-5 models. According to Car and Driver magazine, the exact contents of Mazda's shipment were 2,804 Mazda3, 1,329 CX-7, 295 MX-5, 214 RX-8, 56 Mazda5, and 5 Mazdaspeed6 models. The remaining 2.3% of the vehicles on board (approximately 110 vehicles) were from Isuzu, mostly Isuzu Elf trucks. In total, the cargo had an estimated value of US$117 million.

=== Salvage effort ===
A marine salvage team from Titan Salvage arrived on site on 30 July 2006. Led by Salvage Master Captain Rich Habib, the team was able to get aboard the vessel via a United States Coast Guard helicopter from the cutter Morgenthau. Later that day naval architect Marty Johnson slipped and fell to his death as the salvage team was preparing to leave the Cougar Ace and board the tugboat Emma Foss. Johnson was a 40-year-old resident of Issaquah, Washington and employee of Crowley, the parent company of Titan Salvage.

Titan Salvage subsequently towed the vessel through Samalga Pass to the north side of the Aleutian Islands for protection from the weather using the tugboats Sea Victory, Gladiator and Emma Foss. It was then taken to Unalaska Island, where it was moored to Icicle Seafoods' mooring buoy. Cougar Ace was righted and returned to Mitsui OSK Lines on 16 August 2006, and on 25 August put under tow to Portland, Oregon for inspection and repair.

=== Disposition of cargo ===
Mazda officials reported minimal damage to the vehicles on board despite the ship listing for over a month. However, according to the US Coast Guard, 41 vehicles broke loose and shifted.

On 11 September 2006, one day before the Cougar Ace arrived in Portland to begin unloading, Mazda USA announced that none of the Mazdas aboard would be sold as new vehicles. Mazda USA published a list of VINs for the affected Mazda vehicles on their website.

On 15 December 2006, Mazda announced that all vehicles on the Cougar Ace would be scrapped. After an extensive process to deploy all the airbags in each vehicle, all of the Mazda cars were crushed onsite at the Port of Portland by Pacific Car Crushing. The last Mazda car from the shipment was crushed on 6 May 2008.

== Appearances in media ==
The Cougar Ace was covered extensively by the automotive press because of the sheer number of new cars that Mazda scrapped after the incident. She has a cameo of sorts in episode one, season three, of the television series Deadliest Catch. She is shown, temporarily anchored in Dutch Harbor in the Aleutian islands, awaiting further recovery.

== Scrapping ==
In June 2020 Cougar Ace was sold for scrap. She was beached at Alang, India on 23 June 2020 and scrapped.

== Gallery ==
Video

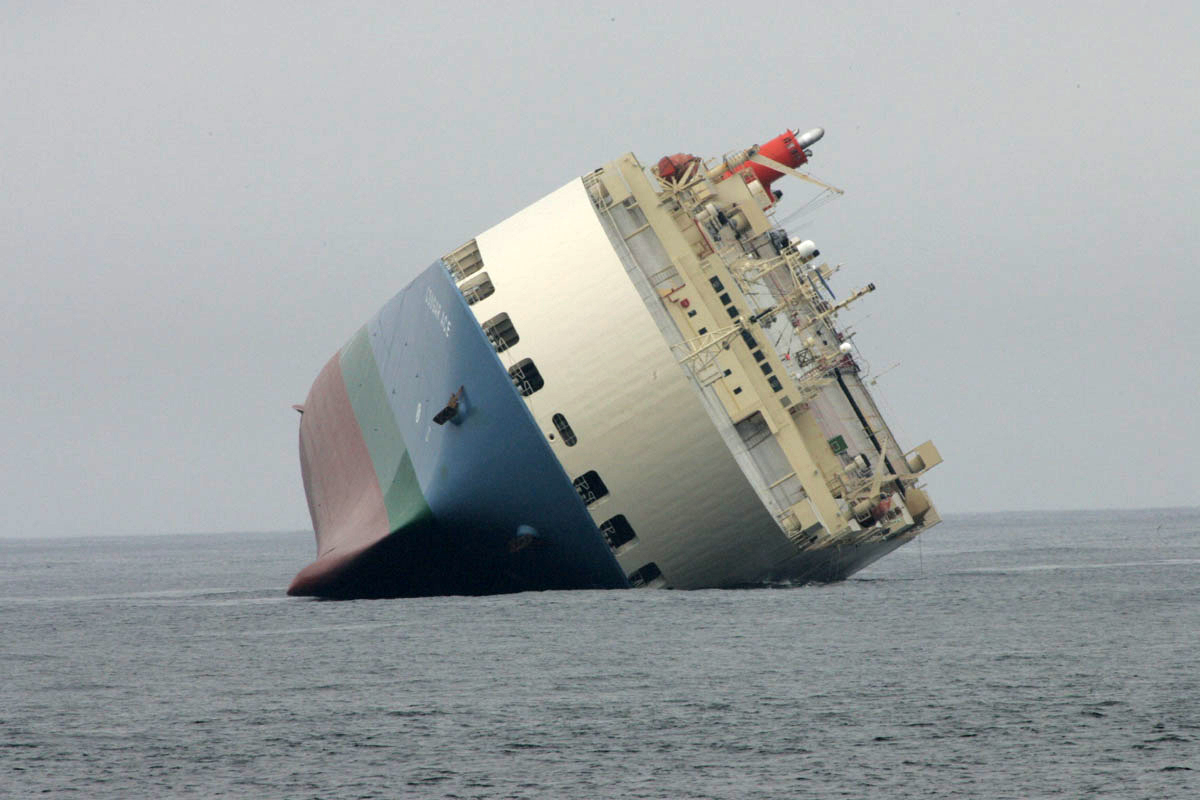
The Cougar Ace listing on 14 August 2006 (over three weeks after the incident), view from the bow

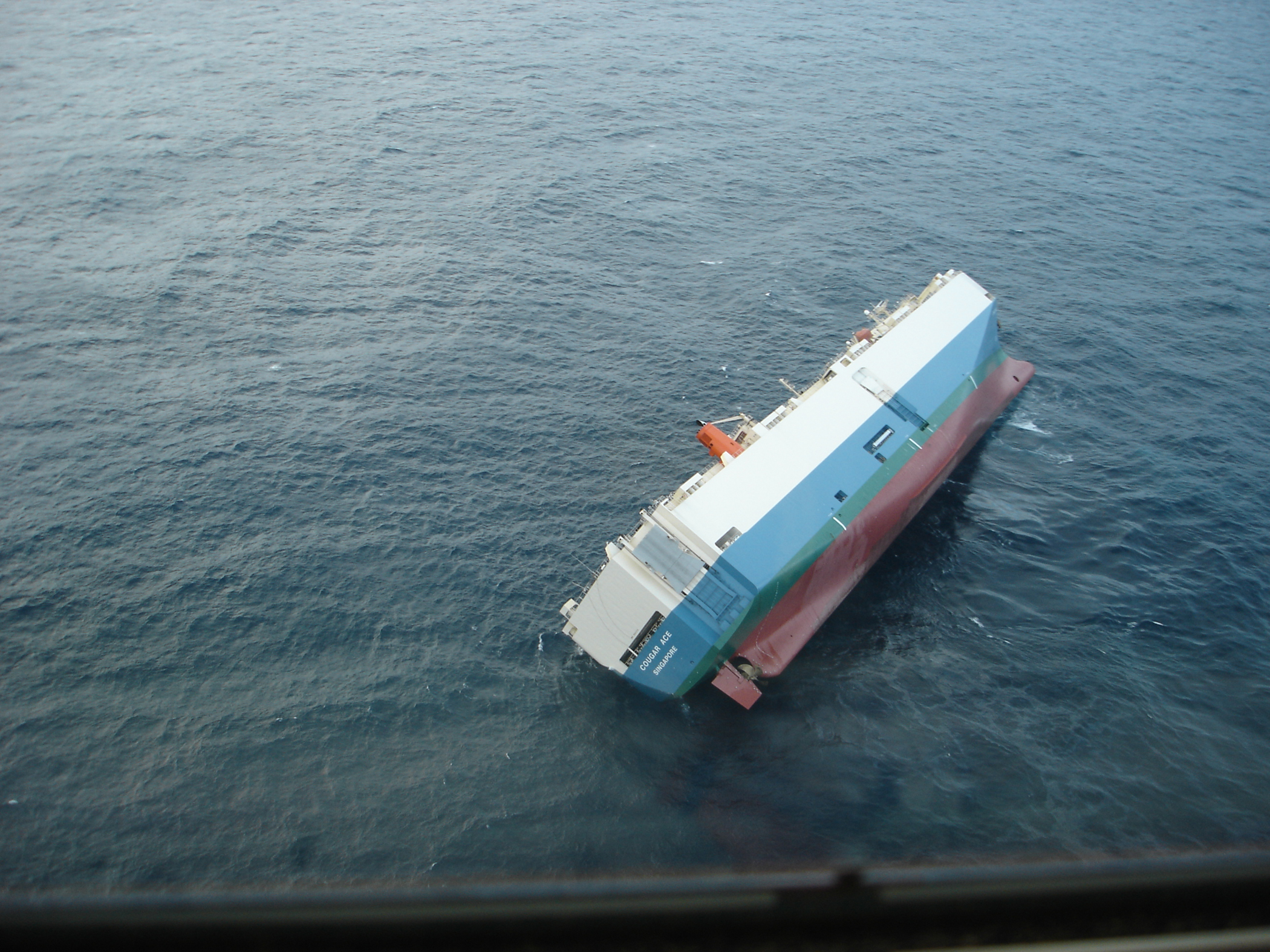
View from above

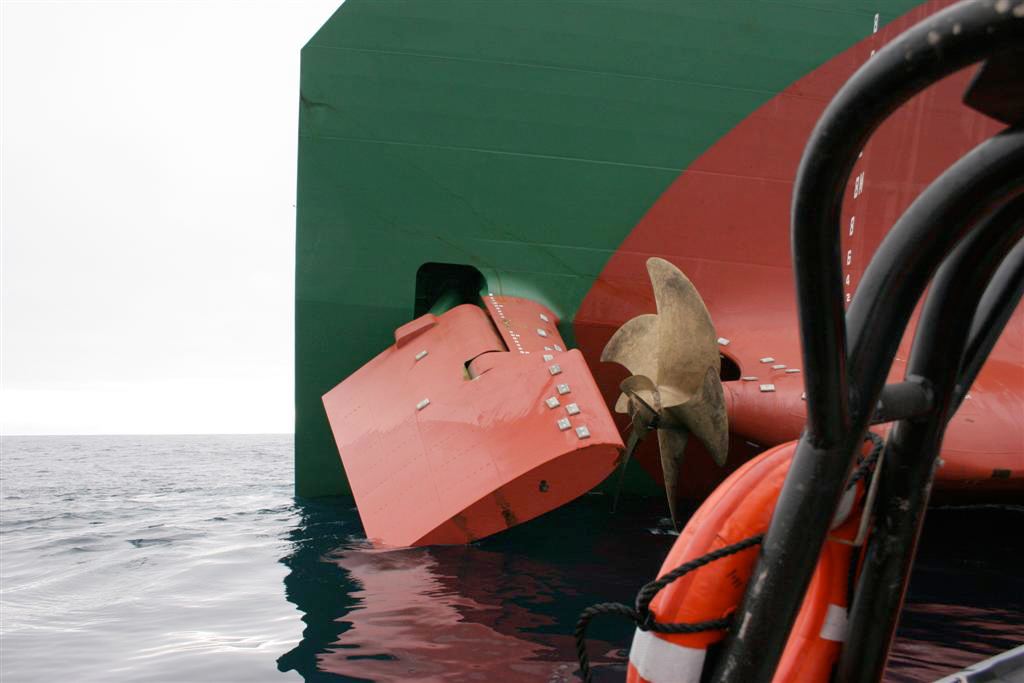
The rudder and the propeller of Cougar Ace are lifted after her 60° list to her portside.

== See also ==
- List of roll-on/roll-off vessel accidents
- Golden Ray, a car carrier which capsized off Brunswick, Georgia in 2019
- Höegh Osaka, a car carrier which had a major list incident in 2015
- Reijin, a car carrier which capsized off Oporto in 1988
