= Sea Victory =

Ocean-going Tugboat

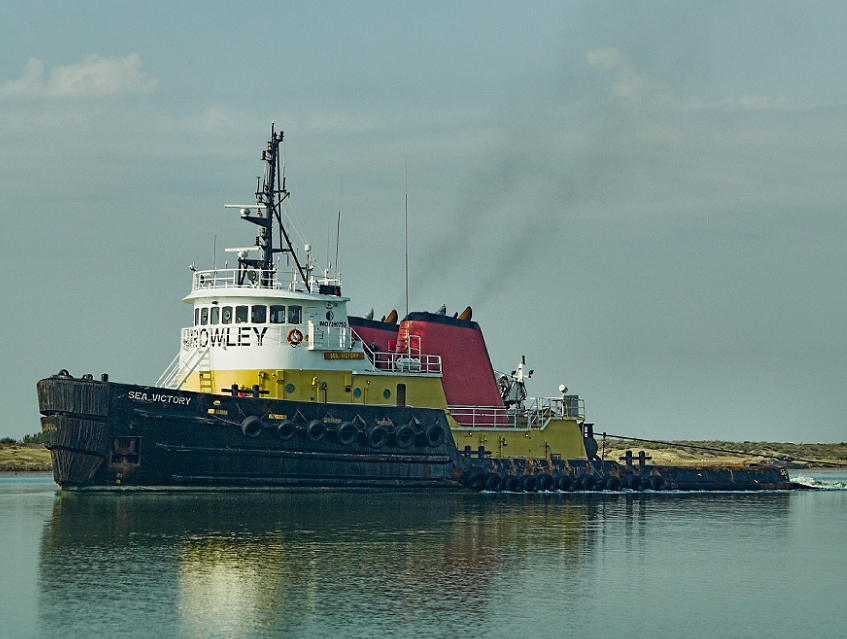
- Sea Victory

History

United States
- Name: Martha Theriot (1974 - 1984); Martha (1984 - 1988); Independent Victory (1988 - 1992); Sea Victory (1992 - 2012); Jonah Falgout (2021 - 2022)
- Launched: October 1974
- Identification: Official number: 561652; IMO number: 7390753
- Fate: Scrapped 2023

General characteristics
- Length: 150 ft (46 m) overall
- Beam: 40 ft (12 m)
- Draft: 20 ft 3 in (6.17 m)
- Installed power: 5.37 megawatts (7,200 hp) sustained
- Propulsion: 2 × General Motors EMD 20-645 E5 Diesel engines
- Speed: 11 knots (20 km/h; 13 mph)

Sea Victory was an ocean-going tugboat. She is best known for her long-distance tows of several of the U.S. Navy's most celebrated and historic vessels. For much of her career she was one of the most powerful American-flagged tugs, which earned her major jobs that could not be completed by smaller vessels. She was launched in 1974 and scrapped, likely in 2023.

== Construction and characteristics ==
The tug was designed for multiple missions, particularly anchor handling for offshore oil platforms and ocean towing. She was built by the Equitable Equipment Company, Inc. for Nolty J. Theriot, Inc. She was built in Equitable's Madisonville, Louisiana shipyard. She was the first of seven vessels of her class Nolty J. Theriot intended to build.

Her original cost was $2,968,715. Of this amount, $2,605,000 was financed by a loan guaranteed by the U.S. Maritime Administration under Title XI of the Merchant Marine Act of 1936. The guarantee was dated August 21, 1974.

She was launched in October 1974. While still moored at the shipyard, undergoing the final stages of construction, there were two fatal incidents aboard. In the first, a shipyard worker climbed her mast nude, and leapt to his death while co-workers attempted to talk him down. Then, in November 1974, a worker was overcome and killed by paint fumes while coating a ballast tank.

Her hull was built of welded steel plates. It was ice-strengthened for service in the offshore oil fields of the North Sea. She was 149 feet 6 inches (45.57 m) in overall length, with a beam of 40 feet (12 m), and a full-load draft of 20 feet 3 inches (6.17 m). Her gross registered tonnage was 173, and her net registered tonnage was 117. Under international rules, her gross tonnage was 930, and her net 279.

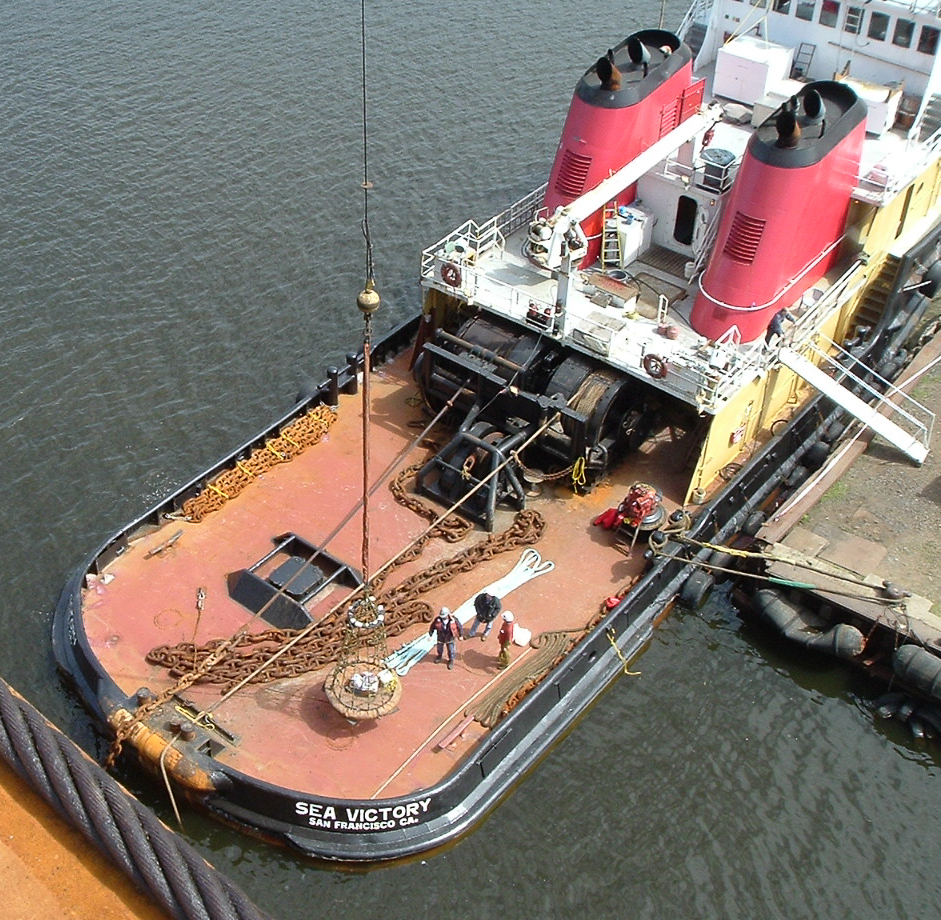
Sea Victory's aft deck showing towing winch

She had two fixed-pitch, stainless steel, four-bladed propellers with kort nozzles. These were driven by two GM EMD 20-645-E5 20-cylinder Diesel engines. These produced 7,200 continuous brake horsepower and would drive the ship at 11 knots. Towing ahead, her engines could produce 240,000 pounds of bollard pull.

Electrical power aboard was provided by two Detroit Diesel 8v-71 generators.

Her tanks held 190,000 gallons of diesel fuel. With a full load, her engines would consume this fuel at a rate of 7,200 gallons per day. She also carried 3,350 gallons of lube oil, and 7,950 gallons of potable water.

Her tow winch was an Intercon DD-250. It had two drums which carried variously sized cables over her years of service.

== Martha Theriot (1974—1984) ==
Her first name out of the shipyard was Martha Theriot. She was the second ship of this name owned by Nolty J. Theriot, Inc. Her first job was to tow a jet barge, 250 feet (76 m) long, from New Orleans to the North Sea. She left on this trip in March 1974.

On August 21, 1980, the Texaco gasoline tanker North Dakota struck an unmanned Chevron oil production platform in the Gulf of Mexico about 150 miles (240 km) southeast of New Orleans. The tanker bust into flames and 12,000 gallons of gasoline burned off. Two days after the accident, Martha Theriot pulled North Dakota off the oil rig and towed her to Port Arthur, Texas.

== Martha (1984—1988) ==
In 1984 Martha Theriot was sold to International Offshore Services, Inc., an affiliate of WFI Industries, which renamed her Martha. International Offshore Services, Inc., along with several other WFI Industries-affiliated companies, filed for reorganization in bankruptcy in 1986. The court approved the plan of reorganization in August 1988. This plan combined all the affiliates' tug and barge operations, including Martha, into a newly formed entity, United Marine Tug and Barge, Inc.

== Independent Victory (1988—1992) ==
The newly formed United Marine Tug and Barge, Inc. changed the ship's name to Independent Victory.

== Sea Victory (1992—2012) ==
In 1992 Independent Victory was purchased by the Puget Sound Tug and Barge Company, a subsidiary of Crowley Marine Services, Inc. Crowley changed her name to Sea Victory.

=== Missouri tow (1998) ===
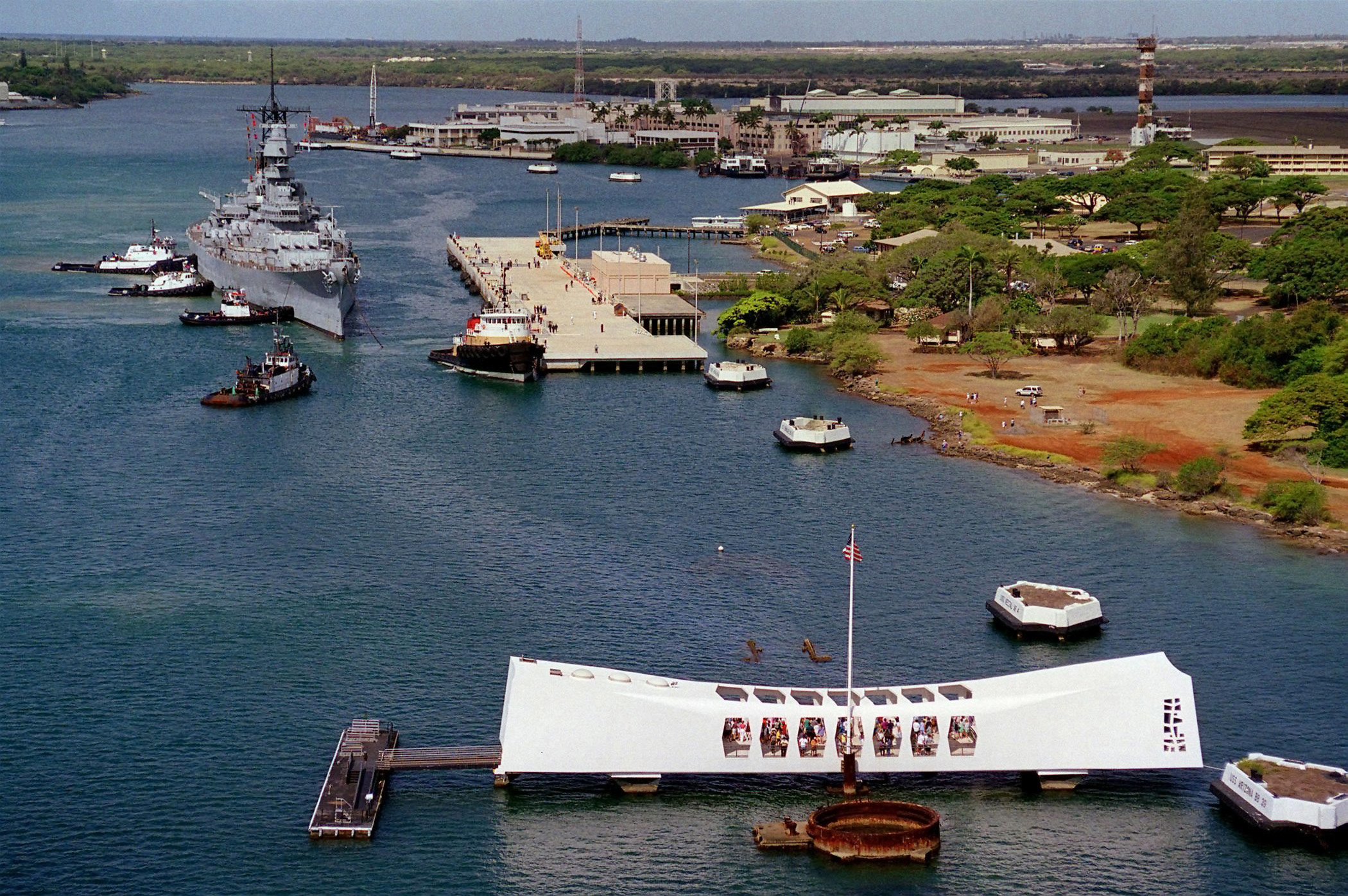
Sea Victory tows ex-USS Missouri to her berth in Pearl Harbor on June 22, 1998

The Iowa-class battleship USS Missouri was struck from the Navy List on January 12, 1995. After a lengthy and contentious selection process, on March 4, 1998, Secretary of the Navy John Dalton transferred the ship to USS Missouri Memorial Association for display in Pearl Harbor, Hawaii. Under the terms of the transfer, the Association was responsible for moving Missouri from the Puget Sound Naval Shipyard to her new home across the Pacific. Crowley was hired for the job and assigned Sea Victory to the tow. Readying the battleship for the trip, plus the towing contract, was reported to have cost $800,000.

Sea Victory, with Missouri in tow, sailed from Bremerton, Washington on May 23, 1998. Instead of heading directly to Hawaii, she sailed for Astoria, Oregon to bathe the battleship's hull in the fresh water of the Columbia River. This was a safety precaution to kill the accumulation of marine growth on Missouri's hull to avoid importing any invasive species to Hawaiian waters. She arrived at Astoria on May 26. On June 3, 1998, the ships left Astoria on the final leg to Hawaii. She arrived at Pearl Harbor on June 22, 1998, and was met by a crowd estimated at 20,000 people.

Connecting Sea Victory and Missouri was the tug's 3,600-foot long, 2 1/2-inch diameter tow wire, 180 feet of 3 3/8-inch chain, and a 400-foot tow pennant. The weight of the link between tug and tow was estimated at 81,258 pounds.

=== New Carissa salvage (1999) ===
On February 4, 1999, the 639-foot (195m) long freighter New Carissa drifted ashore while waiting to cross the bar into Coos Bay, Oregon. Stormy weather had made the bar impassable. She quickly became an environmental threat as fuel tanks ruptured. The ship was set alight to burn off as much oil as possible before it spilled onto the beach, and in the aftermath of the fire she broke in two. While the stern looked hopelessly beached, and indeed took several years to remove, plans were made to tow the bow section out to sea and sink it in deep, cold water that would solidify the thick bunker oil still aboard. Sea Victory was hired for the tow by Smit Americas, Inc., the salvage company hired by New Carissa's owners.

A special long, synthetic, floating tow line was flown in from Holland. On February 23, 1999, a helicopter attempted to attach the tow line to New Carissa's bow, but the effort was frustrated by high winds. On February 26 the line was finally attached to the wreck and Sea Victory began to tow it back into the water aided by high tides and efforts to dewater the hulk. Progress was slow, but on March 1, 1999 Sea Victory was finally able to tow the bow away from the beach.

After a 19-hour tow Sea Victory had moved the wreck 50 miles offshore. Another winter storm had reached the tug and tow, however, lashing them with 60 mph sustained winds and heavy seas. The tow line broke, and the derelict bow section drifted back to shore. It went aground again at Waldport, Oregon on March 3. Using a U.S. Navy 2,400 foot tow line, Sea Victory was able to pull to bow off the beach on March 8. The tug brought the wreckage 280 miles (450 km) offshore where it was sunk by naval gunfire and a torpedo on March 11, 1999.

=== ex-Oriskany tow (1999) ===
The Essex-class aircraft carrier USS Oriskany was decommissioned on September 30, 1976. In the early 1980s, consideration was given to reactivating her but was rejected by Congress due to cost and the obsolescene of the ship. With no prospect for reactivation, the ship was struck from the Navy List in 1989. Various efforts to sell her, or turn her into a museum failed. With the impending closure of the Mare Island Naval Shipyard, where ex-Oriskany was moored, the Navy decided to move her to facilities at Beaumont, Texas prior to scrapping the ship. In late 1998, bids were solicited to tow the ship to Texas. In mid-January 1999 the Navy issued a contract to Crowley Marine Services for the job.

Crowley gave consideration to towing the ship through the Panama Canal. The 195-foot (59m) extreme width of her flight deck made her too broad for the 110-foot (34m) wide locks, so the cost and feasibility of cutting off the over-width portions of the ship was explored. This option was rejected by both the Navy and the Panama Canal Authority. This necessitated a 15,000-mile (24,000 km) tow from Vallejo to Beaumont through the Strait of Magellan. Sea Victory was chosen for the tow.

Crowley engineers and The Salvage Association, acting on behalf of the insurance underwriters, made a number technical decisions to effect the tow. First, Sea Victory's 2 1/2-inch tow wire was replaced by 2 3/4-inch wire. A new winch was added to manage a new 400 feet (120 m) tow pennant. Concern for drag from the four 15 feet (4.6 m)-diameter propellers, caused the removal of the two inboard propellers by cutting through the propeller shafts. A temporary anchoring system was installed on ex-Oriskany so Sea Victory could leave her long enough to refuel in five ports along the route.

On April 30, 1999 Sea Victory towed the carrier out of San Francisco Bay. She made fueling stops in Balboa, Canal Zone, Valparaiso, Chile, Punta Arenas, Chile, Recife, Brazil, and Port of Spain Trinidad. Sea Victory and ex-Oriskany arrived in Beaumont on August 10, 1999. The trip took 112 days at an average speed of 6.67 knots. The day after her arrival, she sailed to Seattle, via the Panama Canal, where she arrived on September 1, 1999.

=== ex-New Jersey tow (1999) ===
USS New Jersey was an Iowa-class battleship. She was decommissioned February 8, 1991 and placed in reserve. She was struck from the Navy List on January 4, 1999. There was great interest in securing the ship as a floating museum, and New Jersey's Congressional delegation inserted a provision into the 1999 Department of Defense budget that required the Navy to sell ex-New Jersey to a non-profit, but only to an organization in the state. Two New Jersey–based organizations competed for the donation. The State of New Jersey agreed to back whichever could win Navy approval and contracted with Crowley to tow the ship from the west coast.

Sea Victory towed ex-New Jersey from her moorings at the Naval Inactive Ship Maintenance Facility in Bremerton, Washington on September 12, 1999, less than two weeks after returning from her ex-Oriskany tow. On September 21, 1999, she stopped briefly in Long Beach to take on approximately 80,000 gallons of fuel. Her next stop was Balboa, Panama where she fueled again. On October 18, 1999, the ships began their voyage through the Panama Canal. New Jersey Governor Christine Todd Whitman and a large party were aboard ex-New Jersey as she was lifted in the first lock chamber. Sea Victory towed the ship across Gatun Lake to reach the locks on the Atlantic side of the canal.

After passing into the Gulf of Mexico, the turbocharger on Sea Victory's port engine failed, and the engine had to be shut down. This decreased the speed of the ships to between 2 and 3 knots. They were slowed further by detouring closer Cuba to avoid bad weather and swells generated by Tropical Storm Katrina. Crowley sent the tug Mariner from its Lake Charles, Louisiana base to relieve Sea Victory, so she could sail to Miami for repairs. These were completed and Sea Victory took over the tow to finish the job. The engine troubles and bad weather delayed her arrival by four days, which by happenstance placed it on Memorial Day, much to the delight of the crowds who were able to attend.

The ships arrived at the Philadelphia Naval Shipyard on November 11, 1999. The ship remained off-limits to visitors while the Navy decided between the two competing proposals to display her. On January 20, 2000, Secretary of the Navy Richard Danzig announced the donation of the ship to the Home Port Alliance, which intended to display ex-New Jersey in Camden.

Sea Victory's tow of ex-New Jersey from Bremerton to Philadelphia, including transit fees for use of the Panama Canal, was reported to have cost $2 million, paid for by the State of New Jersey.

=== ex-Iowa tow (2001) ===
USS Iowa was the lead ship of the Iowa-class, the largest battleships ever launched by the United States. She was decommissioned for the last time on October 26, 1990 and stored at the Navy Inactive Ship Maintenance Facility in Philadelphia. When the Philadelphia Naval Shipyard was closed in 1995, ex-Iowa was moved to Naval Station Newport. As with the other Iowa-class ships, numerous museum groups wanted her as their star attraction. The Congressional compromise in 1999 that sent ex-New Jersey from Bremerton to New Jersey, sent ex-Iowa to California, where a number of different groups vied to convert her into a museum ship. It was reported that California Senator Dianne Feinstein inserted $3 million into the 2000 defense appropriation bill to pay for the tow, and as a member of the Senate Appropriations Committee she was in a position to do so.

Sea Victory towed ex-Iowa out of Newport on March 8, 2001. The two ships took three days to transit the Panama Canal. They passed through the Miraflores locks on March 28, 2001. Sea Victory delivered ex-Iowa to the Suisun Bay Reserve Fleet on April 21, 2001.

=== Orlan tow (2001, 2004, 2005) ===
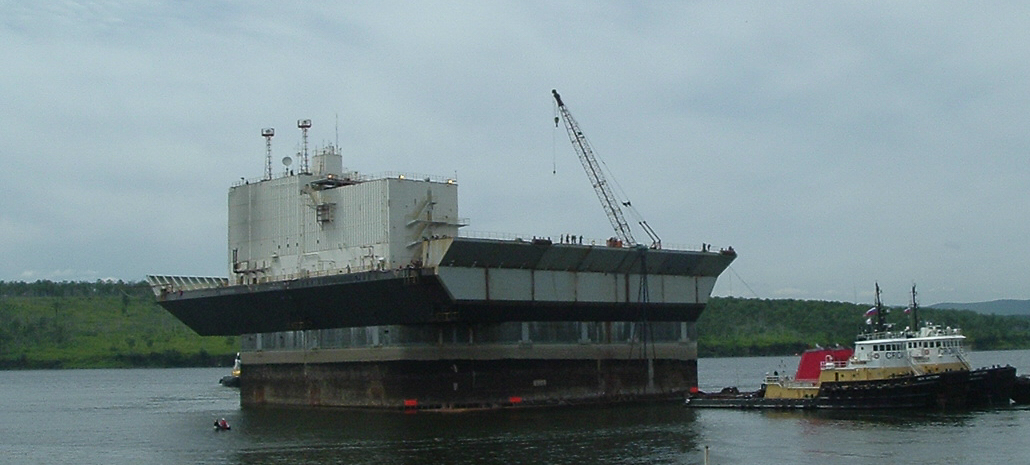
Sea Victory and Sea Venture preparing to tow Orlan to Korea in 2004

The Glomar Beaufort Sea I Concrete Island Drilling System, usually referred to simply as "CIDS", was one of the largest structures of its kind when it was built in 1984. Its main platform was 312 feet (95 m) on a side. In 2001 it was sold to Exxon Neftegas Ltd., a subsidiary of ExxonMobil Corp. Exxon intended to use the platform in its Sakhalin 1 joint venture off the Pacific coast of Russia. On August 31, 2001 Sea Victory, and her sister ship Sea Venture, along with an ice management tug Arctic Klavik, began towing the platform from its work site in the Beaufort Sea to Prudhoe Bay, Alaska. They arrived there on September 4. There the trio rigged for the long ocean tow and sailed to Sovietskaya Gavan, a previously closed port used by the Soviet Pacific Fleet. They arrived on October 14, 2001.

Exxon renamed CIDS "Orlan" (Орлан), Russian for sea eagle. Modifications to the Orlan platform were made at Sovietskaya Gavan, and in 2004 she was towed to the Hyundai Heavy Industries shipyard in Ulsan, Korea to complete the work. Sea Victory and Sea Venture towed along with the Smitwijs tug Wolraad Woltemade. When the work at Ulsan was complete in 2005, the same trio of tugs towed her to her work location offshore Chayvo, east of Sakhalin Island.

=== APL Panama salvage (2006) ===
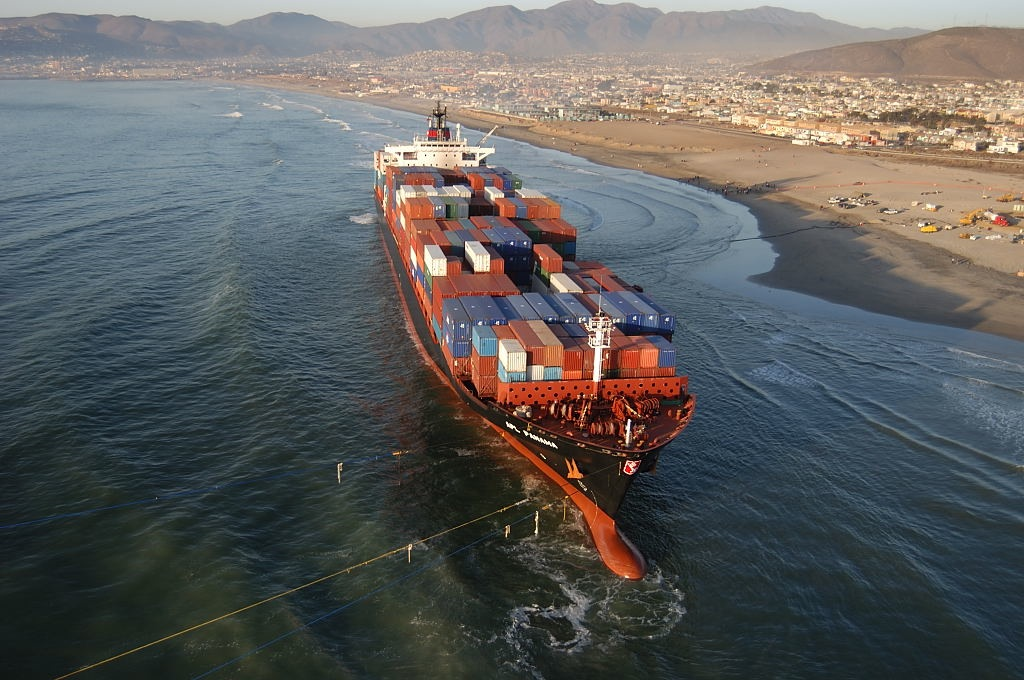
APL Panama aground at Ensenada

On December 25, 2005, the 874-foot long containership APL Panama went aground just south of the harbor entrance at Ensenada, Mexico. Her owners hired Crowley's salvage arm to move the vessel off the beach and Sea Victory was dispatched to the scene in January. She and six other tugs, a hopper dredge, and other equipment finally floated her free on March 10, 2006. As she came off the beach, APL Panama was taken in tow by Sea Victory while the containership's hull and propeller were inspected for damage.

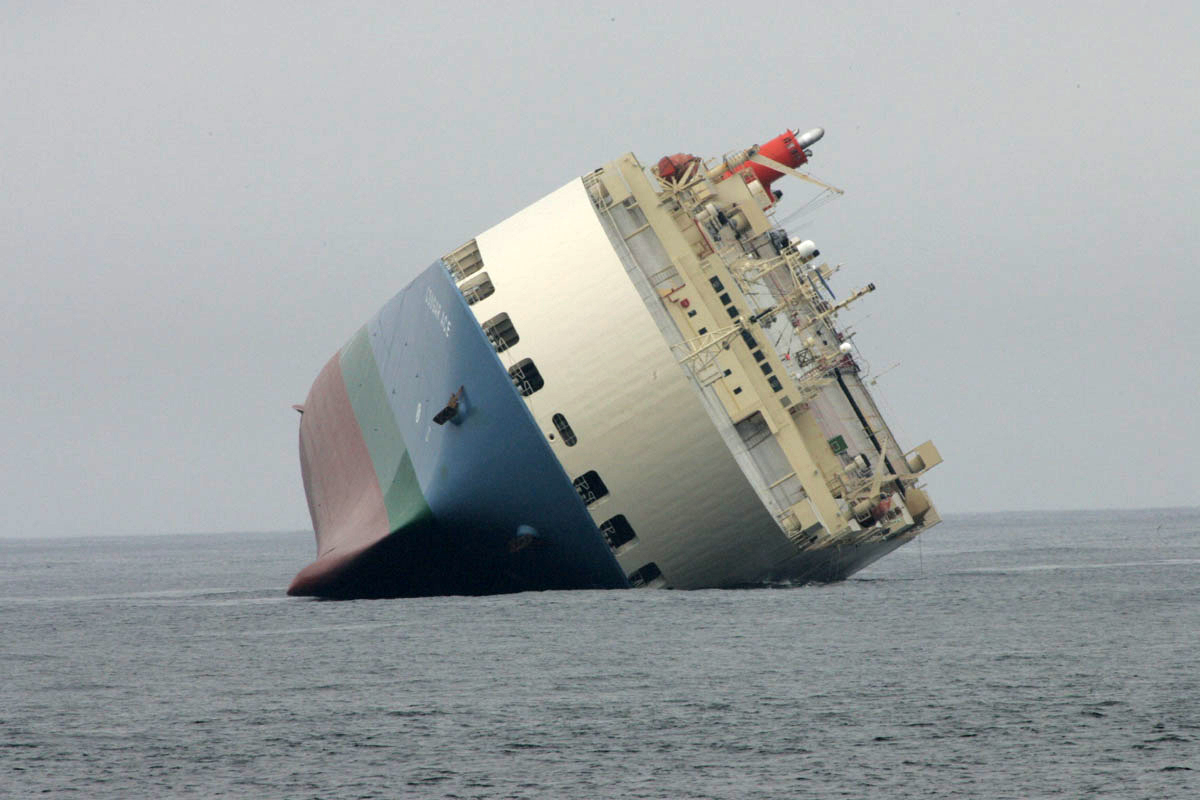
Cougar Ace listing

=== Cougar Ace salvage (2006) ===
The 654-foot long car carrier Cougar Ace had 4,703 brand-new Mazda cars aboard when she left Hiroshima, Japan in mid-July 2006. She was headed to Vancouver, B.C. as her first stop on the voyage. She was sailing south of the Aleutians on July 23, 2006, when, pursuant to the Canadian Shipping Act, she began to pump out the ballast water taken on in Japan to prevent the importation of invasive species to North American waters. Had this routine matter been handled correctly, new ballast water would have been pumped in as the old was pumped out and the ship would have remained on an even keel. It was not. As the starboard ballast water was pumped out and not replaced, the ship became unbalanced and assumed a large port list that completely disabled her.

Sea Victory and Titan Salvage took Cougar Ace in tow on August 2, 2006. They towed the ship north through Samalga Pass and brought her to Wide Bay on Unalaska Island, Alaska which she reached on August 8, 2006. Crowley engineers executed a pumping plan which righted the ship, but Mazda decided to crush her cargo of cars rather than sell them in case their weeks of hanging from extreme angles had damaged them.

=== Chemul tow (2008) ===
During Hurricane Katrina in 2005, the submersible drilling platform Chemul broke free of its moorings and floated up the Mobile River until it jammed under a bridge. Damage to the drilling rig's superstructure was significant. The platform's owner, the Mexican national oil company PEMEX, contracted to have it converted to a floating hotel and support platform at a shipyard in Halifax, Nova Scotia. In March and April 2008, Sea Victory and sister ship Sea Venture towed the drilling platform from Mobile to Halifax.

Sea Victory was idled and went out of Coast Guard documentation in 2012, thirty-eight years old.

== Jonah Falgout (2021—2022) ==
The vessel was acquired by Offshore Towing Services, Inc. of Larose, Louisiana, likely in 2021. Her name was changed to Jonah Falgout. According to US Coast Guard records, she was first inspected under her new name in August 2021. She was inspected again in November 2022. These same Coast Guard record shows her current status as "scrapped".
