= Leif Høegh =

Norwegian ship-owner and businessman (1896–1974)

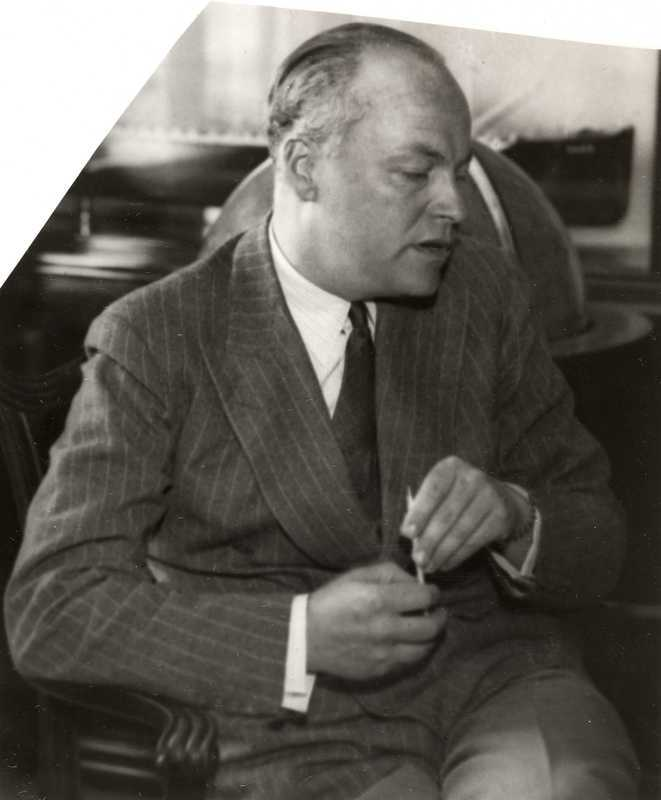
Leif Høegh. ca 1935

Leif Høegh (21 April 1896 - 23 May 1974) was a Norwegian shipowner. He founded the international shipping company known as Leif Höegh & Co in 1927.

== Biography ==
Høegh was born in Kristiania (now Oslo), Norway. He was the son of Nils Vogt Petersen (1852-1927) and Elise Olsen (1864-1952) He grew up in the neighborhood of Frogner where his father was employed by Westye Egeberg & Co. He graduated from the University of Kristiania (now University of Oslo) in 1916. In 1919, Høegh was employed by Wilh. Wilhelmsen as agent for the shipping line between New York City and South America.

Høegh ordered his first ship in 1927 and developed an enterprise with a leading position in the global maritime transportation sector. At the time of the Norwegian invasion by Nazi Germany on April 9, 1940, the entire Høegh fleet was outside German-controlled area. German officials order all Norwegian merchant ships sail to a neutral or German-controlled port. With his failure to comply, Høegh was sent to Bredtveit Prison. Subsequently released, Høegh fled from Norway during the later phase of World War II.

He later represented Norwegian maritime interests with the United Maritime Authority with headquarters in London and Washington, DC. He was an attendee of all Bilderberg Group (Bilderberg-gruppen) meetings between 1954 and 1974 (except in 1955) and was a member of the Steering Committee of the Bilderberg Group.

In 1966, his eldest son Ove Dines Høegh took his place in the board of directors and in 1974, his younger son Morten Westye Høegh became a board member.

== Honors ==
- Order of St. Olav
- Order of the Dannebrog
- Order of Vasa
- Order of the White Rose of Finland
- Legion of Honour

== Related reading ==
- Bakka, Dag (1997) Höegh: Shipping through Cycles: Leif Höegh & Co, 1927-1997 (Oslo: Leif Höegh & Co) ISBN 8291258074
