= Reijin =

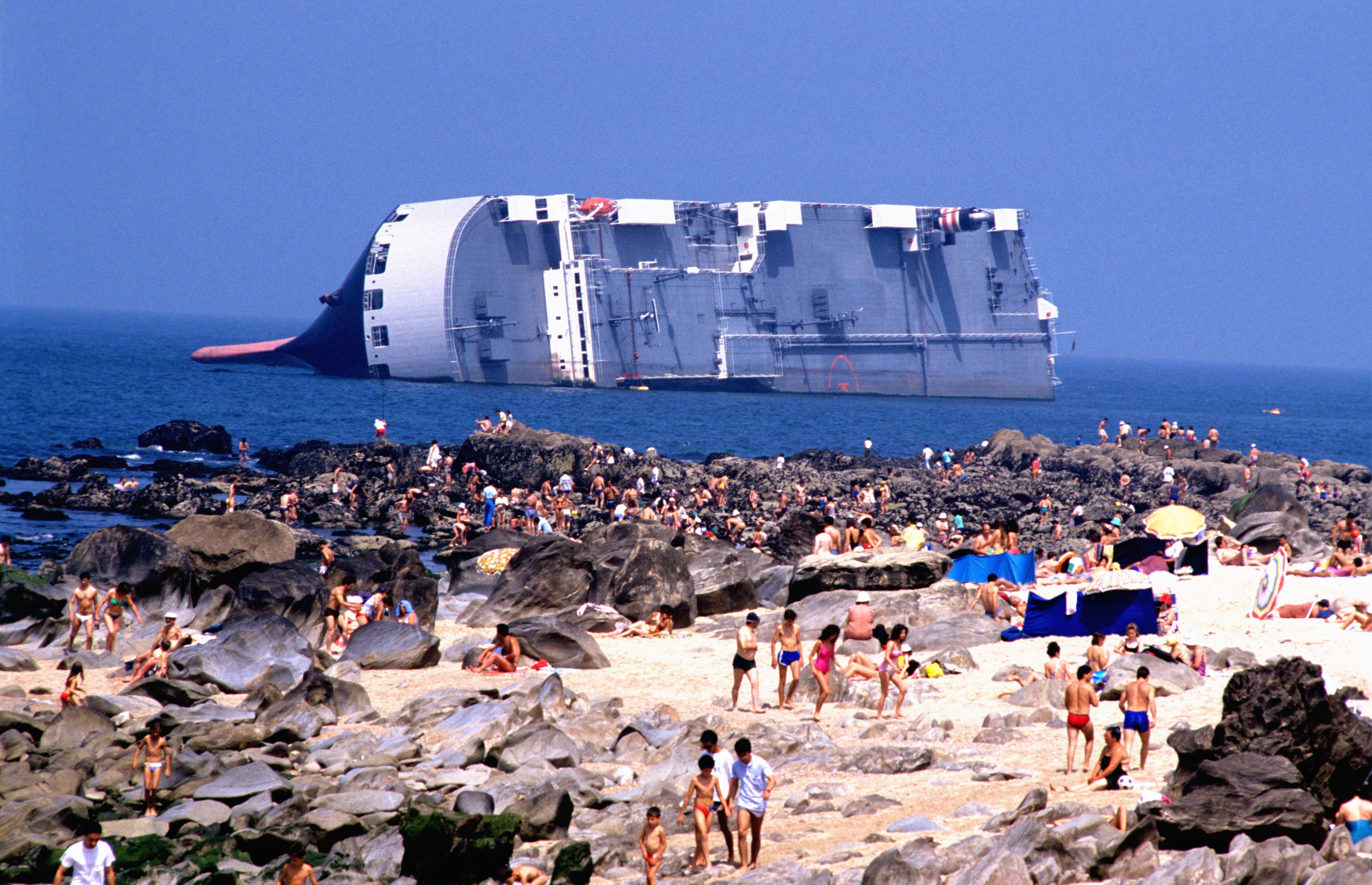
- Reijin aground

History
- Name: Reijin
- Owner: Nissan Prince Kaiun K.K.
- Operator: Emerald Shipholding SA
- Port of registry: Panama
- Builder: Shin Kurushima Dockyard Co, Onishi
- Yard number: 2535
- Launched: 19 December 1987
- Out of service: 26 April 1988
- Fate: Scuttled

General characteristics
- Tonnage: 58,128 GT; 17,469 DWT
- Length: 199 metres (653 ft)
- Beam: 32 metres (105 ft)
- Installed power: Diesel engine
- Propulsion: Screw propeller

Reijin was a Panamanian car carrier that capsized off Porto, Portugal, in April 1988 on her maiden voyage. The ship was later scuttled in deep water despite the protests of ecologists.

== Description ==
Reijin was built as yard number 2535 in 1987 by the Shin Kurushima Dockyard Co, Imabari, Ehime Prefecture, Japan. The ship was 199 metres (653 ft) long with a beam of 32 metres (105 ft). The ship was powered by a diesel engine driving a single screw propeller. She was assessed as 58,123 GT, 17,469 DWT.

== History ==
Reijin was launched on 19 December 1987. She was built for Nissan Prince Kaiun. She was operated by Emerald Shipholding. Her port of registry was Panama City. The IMO Number 8708842 was allocated. On 26 April 1988, she ran aground and capsized off Porto, Portugal. One crew member was killed. She was carrying a cargo of 5,432 new cars. Reijin was on her maiden voyage, from Japan to Ireland.

It was decided that two-thirds of the cars were to be dumped in water in excess of 2,000 metres (6,600 ft) deep, followed by the sinking of the ship in waters of a similar depth. Although the dumping of the cars was started, it was not completed as such action was in violation of the London Dumping Convention, due to the plastics contained in the cars. Reijin was sunk in deep water.

== See also ==
- List of roll-on/roll-off vessel accidents
- Cougar Ace
- Höegh Osaka
