= Bramble Bank =

Sandbar in the Solent, off the coast of Great Britain

Coordinates: 50°47′41″N 1°17′15″W

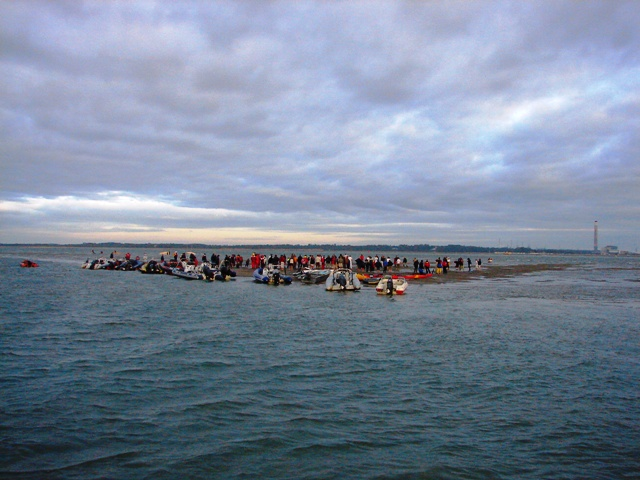
The annual Bramble Bank cricket match.

The Bramble Bank, otherwise known simply as "The Brambles" is an arrowhead-shaped sandbar in the central Solent on the southern coast of Great Britain which is uncovered at low water spring tides. At other times it presents either a significant navigational hazard or a useful escape from the strong Solent tides. The bank is moving very slowly westward, but is roughly equidistant between the entrance to Southampton Water in the north and the mouth of the River Medina in the south. It is marked at its southeastern limit by the Brambles post sea mark and on its western limit by the West Knoll buoy.

The Brambles post has comprehensive weather and sea state monitoring equipment which is relayed in realtime to a website.

The sandbar is known for the annual cricket match held there, when the Royal Southern Yacht Club (RSrnYC) play the Island Sailing Club.

== Cricket match ==
Each year, the Royal Southern Yacht Club (RSrnYC) and the Island Sailing Club meet on the sandbar for a game of cricket. The match takes place when the bank is exposed but never lasts very long before the tide returns. The undulating surface with large puddles ensures it is more a social occasion than a serious cricket match, and the scoring reflects this - the victor of the game is pre-determined, and the two clubs simply take it in turns to "win" the match, regardless of play. The first match is said to have been played in the 1950s at the behest of pioneering British boatmaker Uffa Fox.

The Brambles cricket match has been described as "quintessentially English" and has even drawn the attention of a House of Commons Standing Committee, when it was mentioned as a light-hearted example of an event which falls geographically between the boundaries of two different licensing authorities. The match didn’t take place in 2022 due to the death of Elizabeth II.

== Accidents ==
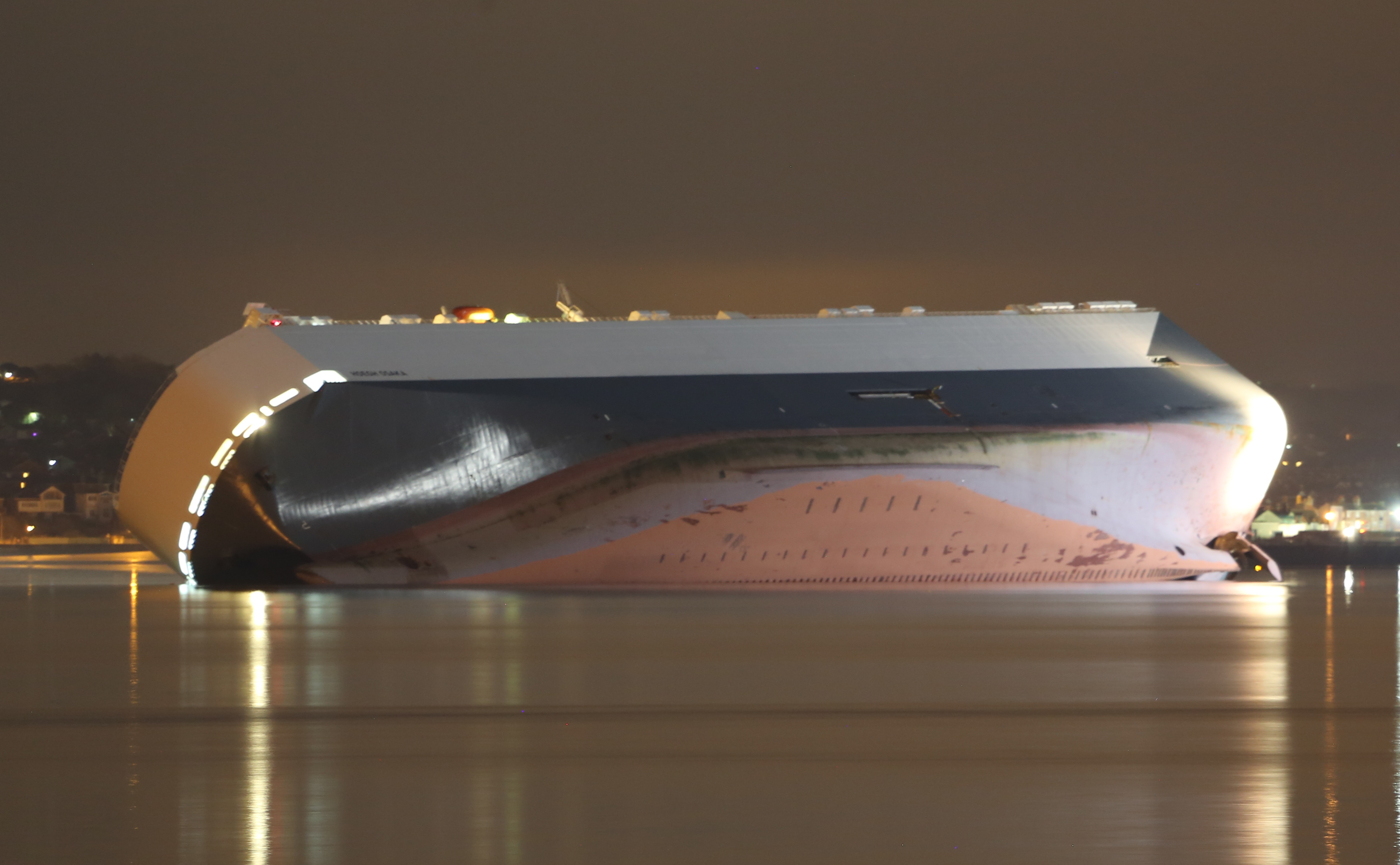
Höegh Osaka beached on the bank in 2015

On 14 April 1947 RMS Queen Elizabeth ran aground on the bank where it remained for 26 hours before being pulled off by tugs.

On Tuesday 11 November 2008, on approaching Southampton Docks for her last visit prior to retirement, the Cunard liner Queen Elizabeth 2 ran aground on the Bramble Bank at approximately 0530 hrs. She required four tugs to pull her clear on the rising tide and arrived in Southampton approximately 90 minutes late.

On 3 January 2015 the car transporter Höegh Osaka was beached on the bank after developing a list. A 200-metre maritime exclusion zone was put in place around the ship until the salvage operation took place, and airspace below 2,000 ft was also closed to aircraft within 1 mile (1.6 km). She was refloated on the rising tide on 7 January 2015, and was towed 2 miles east of the bank and moored between East Cowes and Lee on the Solent to await further salvage operations.

Shortly before 10pm on 13 February 2016 the 368 m (1,207 ft) container ship APL Vanda ran aground on the bank. Several tugs and crew from Calshot lifeboat station attended and, within a couple of hours, the ship was refloated on the rising tide. In October 2024 the container ship One Maneuver was damaged after running aground on the sandbank.

== In popular culture ==
Bramble Bank is shown and labelled on maps of the Solent in Ship Simulator 2008 and Ship Simulator Extremes, but doesn't pose any threat to the player due to an absence of low tide in those games.

Bramble Bank also featured as a location for Tom Scott and Matt Grey's 'Park Bench' series
