= Höegh Osaka =

Car carrier ship

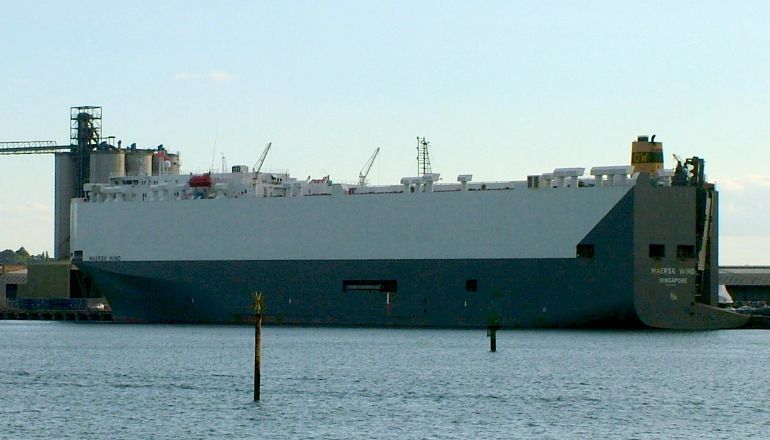
- Maersk Wind at Southampton

History

Singapore
- Name: Maersk Wind (2000–11); Höegh Osaka (since August 2011)
- Owner: A P Møller, Singapore (2000–06); Maersk, Singapore (2006–08); Höegh Autoliners (since 2008)
- Operator: A P Møller, Singapore (2000); A P Møller-Maersk, Copenhagen (2000–07); A P Møller, Singapore (2007–08); Wallem Shipmanagement, Singapore (since 2018)
- Port of registry: Singapore
- Ordered: 29 November 1997
- Builder: Tsuneishi Shipbuilding, Tadotsu, Japan
- Yard number: 1161
- Laid down: 3 December 1999
- Launched: 1 May 2000
- Completed: 7 September 2000
- Identification: IMO number: 9185463; MMSI number: 563248000; Call sign: S6TY
- Status: In service

General characteristics
- Type: Car carrier
- Tonnage: 51,770 GT; 15,532 NT; 16,886 DWT
- Length: 179.90 m (590 ft 3 in) (overall)
- Beam: 32.20 m (105 ft 8 in)
- Draught: 10.15 m (33 ft 4 in)
- Depth: 21.62 metres (70 ft 11 in)
- Installed power: Mitsubishi 8UEC60LS diesel engine, 19,140 hp (14,270 kW)
- Propulsion: Single shaft; fixed-pitch propeller
- Speed: 19.2 knots (35.6 km/h; 22.1 mph)
- Crew: 24

Höegh Osaka is a roll-on/roll-off car carrier ship that was built in 2000 as Maersk Wind for A P Møller, Singapore. She was sold to Höegh Autoliners (Leif Höegh & Co) in 2008 and later renamed Höegh Osaka in August 2011. On 3 January 2015 she developed a severe list, went out of control and grounded in the Solent, England. Her 24 crew members and a pilot were subsequently rescued.

== Construction ==
The ship is 179.90 metres (590 ft 3 in) long overall (171.30 metres [562 ft 0 in] between perpendiculars), with a beam of 32.20 metres (105 ft 8 in). She has a depth of 21.62 metres (70 ft 11 in). Her draught is 10.15 metres (33 ft 4 in).

The ship is powered by a Mitsubishi 8UEC60LS diesel engine, rated at 19,140 horsepower (14,270 kW). It drives a single fixed-pitch propeller, which can propel the ship at 19.2 knots (35.6 km/h; 22.1 mph). She is assessed at 51,770 GT, 16,886 DWT, 15,532 NT. The ship has a capacity of 2,520 cars or 450 lorries.

== History ==
The ship was built in 2000 at yard number 1161 by Tsuneishi Shipbuilding, Tadotsu, Japan. The keel was laid on 3 December 1999 and the ship was launched as Maersk Wind on 1 May 2000 initially under AP Møller, Singapore management. Management was transferred to AP Møller-Maersk, Copenhagen, Denmark later in 2000. Management was transferred back in 2007. In 2008, the ship was sold to Höegh Autocarriers and renamed Höegh Osaka.

The port of registry is Singapore. It has IMO number 9185463 and MMSI number 563248000, and call sign is S6TY. The ship has a maximum speed of 19.2 knots (35.6 km/h). Höegh Osaka is owned by Höegh Autoliners and operated under the management of Wallem Shipmanagement, Singapore.

== Grounding ==
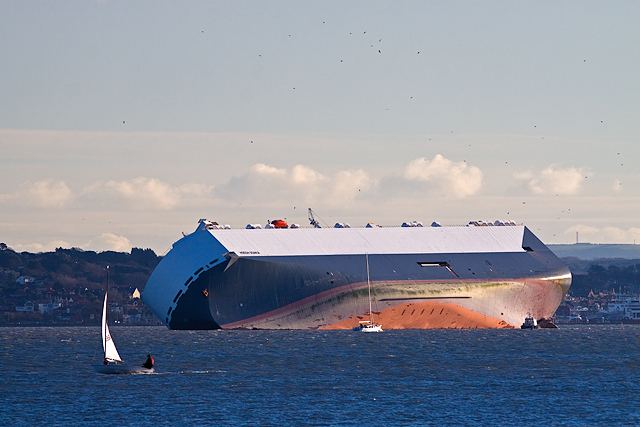
The grounded ship in January 2015

On 3 January 2015 Höegh Osaka was loaded at Southampton, England with a roll-on/roll-off cargo that included 1,300 vehicles including Jaguars, Land Rovers and Minis, 10 Optare buses and 105 JCB construction machines. More cargo was to be loaded at Bremerhaven, Germany, its next stop and then at Hamburg, Germany for more cargo and refuelling. This was a change from the normal route of Hamburg, Bremerhaven and then Southampton.

A pilot embarked at 19:30 and the ship departed at 20:06. At 20:59, the ship made a starboard turn and entered the Thorn Channel travelling at 10 knots (19 km/h). After entering the channel speed increased to 12 knots (22 km/h). At 21:09, Höegh Osaka made a port turn at the West Bramble Buoy and developed a severe list. The pilot gave the order to stop engines at 21:10, and expressed doubts in respect of the metacentric height (GM) of the vessel. As the list increased, the ship's propeller and rudder came clear of the water. The ship grounded on the Bramble Bank in the Solent off the Isle of Wight at 21:15, and settled with a list that would eventually reach 52°.

The owners initially claimed that the beaching on the Bramble Bank was intentional. An official investigation subsequently concluded that the grounding was fortuitous: 'As the heel increased, the rate of turn increased and Hoegh Osaka turned rapidly to port in an uncontrolled manner, leading to the ship grounding on Bramble Bank.'

At 21:19 the D-class inshore lifeboat from Calshot Lifeboat Station was called out. The tugs Svitzer Ferriby and Svitzer Surrey, in Southampton Water at the time, were also sent to the assistance of Höegh Osaka. A Severn-class lifeboat from Yarmouth and an Atlantic 85-class lifeboat from Cowes, Isle of Wight were called out. The second Calshot Lifeboat was then called out. A Coastguard AgustaWestland AW139 helicopter from RNAS Lee-on-Solent (HMS Daedalus) was called out and the tug Apex was also sent to assist.

At 21:54, Svitzer Ferriby arrived at the Bramble Bank and assisted in beaching the ship. One crew member broke an arm and a leg when he fell and slid for about 18 metres (59 ft) in a corridor as the ship listed. A crew member jumped into the water as a lifeboat approached and was rescued. Six crew were winched aboard the helicopter from Lee-on-the-Solent and landed there. RFA Lyme Bay assisted in the coordination of the rescue efforts. A crew member from the Yarmouth Lifeboat was winched onto Höegh Osaka to assist with the evacuation. A Royal Air Force Westland Sea King helicopter was called out from RAF Chivenor. The National Police Air Service also sent a helicopter equipped with night vision equipment. All crew except pilot, captain and chief officer had been rescued by 00:15 on 4 January. All were evacuated at 02:09 because the vessel's list was increasing as the tide fell.

Svitzer were appointed as salvors. A 200 metres (220 yd) maritime exclusion zone was set up around the ship, and airspace below 200 feet (61 m) closed to aircraft within 1 mile (1.6 km). An attempt to refloat the ship was scheduled for 7 January, but cancelled because more water than expected was discovered inside the vessel. The ship refloated without outside assistance later that day assisted by high tide and strong winds, taken in tow and moored approximately 2 miles (3.2 km) east at Alpha Anchorage, between East Cowes and Lee-on-the-Solent to await further salvage operations. On 22 January, Höegh Osaka was towed in to Southampton, salvage operations having reduced the list to 5°.

=== Return to service ===
On 10 February 2015, Höegh Osaka departed from Southampton for Falmouth, Cornwall to be repaired. The ship returned to service on 20 February 2015, sailing from Falmouth via Gibraltar into the Mediterranean Sea headed for Bar, Montenegro.

=== Investigation ===
The Marine Accident Investigation Branch opened an investigation into the accident. Its report into the incident was published on 17 March 2016.

The investigation found that plans for the loading of the cargo had not been changed despite the change in itinerary. No calculation of the vessel's stability had been made, a practice found to be common across many operators' fleets. The weight of cargo on board had been underestimated, being 265 tonnes greater than estimated. The investigation found that although the cargo had shifted as a result of the ship listing, it was not the cause of the list. The ship's ballast water system was not fully serviceable, all but one of the gauges for each ballast tank were unserviceable, a situation that had existed since at least July 2014. It was possible to take manual readings of the amount of water in each ballast tank. The chief officer was in the habit of calculating how much water was transferred between tanks by timing the pumps and using their capacity of 7 tonnes per minute. Some of the straps used to secure the cargo to the deck were found not to meet regulations in force at the time, only being half as strong as they should have been.

== See also ==
- List of roll-on/roll-off vessel accidents
- Cougar Ace, a car carrier which had a major list incident in 2006
- Reijin, a car carrier which capsized off Oporto in 1988
