= List of roll-on/roll-off vessel accidents =

This is a list of roll-on/roll-off vessels involved in maritime incidents and accidents.

Date	Name	Incident
31 January 1953	Princess Victoria	Sank in the North Channel between Scotland and Northern Ireland in a windstorm (that also caused the North Sea flood of 1953); 135 dead.
26 September 1954	Hitaka Maru	Capsized by Typhoon Marie with loss of crew, but no passengers. Also romanized as Hidaka.
26 September 1954	Kitami Maru	Capsized by Typhoon Marie with loss of crew, but no passengers.
26 September 1954	Seikan Maru No 11	Capsized by Typhoon Marie with loss of crew, but no passengers. Refloated in 1956 and returned to service.
26 September 1954	Tokachi Maru	Capsized by Typhoon Marie with loss of crew, but no passengers. Refloated in 1956 and returned to service.
26 September 1954	Tōya Maru	Capsized in Japan’s Tsugaru Strait by Typhoon Marie, 1,170 passengers and crew were killed in the accident.
8 December 1966	SS Heraklion	Unsecured refrigerator truck forced open midship loading door
10 April 1968	TEV Wahine	Caught in storm Cyclone Giselle, ran aground on Barrett Reef, then capsized and sank off New Zealand; 53 dead.
7 June 1980	MS Zenobia	Capsized and sank in the Mediterranean Sea, close to Larnaca, Cyprus due to a software error. No casualties or serious injury
19 December 1982	European Gateway	Capsized off Harwich following a collision with Speedlink Vanguard.
15 February 1985	A Regina	Ran aground and wrecked. No casualties or serious injury
6 March 1987	Herald of Free Enterprise	Capsized off Zeebrugge when the bow door was left open. 193 passengers and crew died.
26 April 1988	Reijin	Capsized and sank off the coast of Portugal on maiden voyage
7 April 1990	Scandinavian Star	Caught fire and burned as a result of arson
10 April 1991	Moby Prince	Caught fire and burned as a result of a collision with an oil tanker. 140 passengers and crew died.
14-15 December 1991	Salem Express	Struck a reef and sank in sight of port at Safaga, Egypt, with at least 464 casualties.
14 January 1993	Jan Heweliusz	Capsized and sunk in the Baltic Sea. 56 dead, 9 survivors, partially due to inefficient rescue efforts.
28 September 1994	Estonia	Had a bow visor failure. Investigations have been reopened in 2020. 852 people aboard were killed in the accident.
18 September 1998	Princess of the Orient	Foundered and sank in Typhoon Vicki. 150 people died.
26 September 2000	Express Samina	Struck a rock and sank off Paros, Greece
26 September 2002	Le Joola	Second deadliest non-military maritime disaster - 1,863 deaths and 64 survivors.
14 December 2002	Tricolor	Collision, no casualties, vessel required salvation by wreck cutting in 9 sections due to being a hazard to navigation.
31 January 2004	Diamond Ray	Collision with container vessel Trade Zale during anchoring in the bay of Ulsan, South Korea, requiring salvage tugs, no casualties
15 May 2004	Hyundai No 105	Collided with tanker MT Kaminesan and sank close to Singapore Sentosa island, no casualties but crew required rescue
3 February 2006	al-Salam Boccaccio 98	Capsized and sank in the Red Sea, there was bad weather but the direct cause of the sinking is unknown, 185 dead bodies were recovered and 813 of them are missing and presumed dead, 998 casualties total.
22 March 2006	Queen of the North	Failed to make a planned course change, ran aground and sank.
23 July 2006	Cougar Ace	Severely listed. Was successfully salvaged and returned to service.
8 March 2007	Repubblica di Genova	Capsized inside Antwerp port, due to possible incorrect stowage and ballast. Towage was required
21 June 2008	Princess of the Stars	Capsized in Typhoon Fengshen. 814 passengers and crew died.
5 December 2012	Baltic Ace	11 fatalities, collision with container vessel Corvus J.
7 May 2013	Jolly Nero	9 fatalities, collision with the Pilots' office tower during unberthing
16 April 2014	Sewol	304 fatalities, caused by insufficient ballast, overloading, and steering error.
28 December 2014	Norman Atlantic	Caught fire in the Strait of Otranto in the Adriatic Sea, 22 casualties (estimated).
3 January 2015	Höegh Osaka	Developed severe list and was intentionally grounded, no casualties
2 June 2015	Courage	US-flagged roll-on roll-off (ro-ro) vehicle carrier Courage was transiting from Bremerhaven, Germany, to Southampton, United Kingdom, when a fire broke out in its cargo hold. The accident resulted in extensive damage to the vessel's hold as well its cargo of vehicles and household goods. As a result of the damage, estimated at $100 million total, the vessel's owners scrapped the vessel. Electrical arcing in the automatic braking system (ABS) of an EV carried on board was concluded as the probable cause of the fire by the National Transportation Safety Board.
1 October 2015	SS El Faro	33 fatalities, sunk in deep water by Hurricane Joaquin
26 January 2016	Modern Express	Severely listed in the Bay of Biscay, crew evacuated, no casualties, vessel required salvation by towage
20 September 2018	Nyerere	228 fatalities, captain distracted by cellphone.
31 December 2018	Sincerity Ace	Caught fire in the middle of the Pacific Ocean about 1,800 nautical miles from Oahu. Nearby commercial ships helped rescue 16 crew members, but five crew members lost their lives in the incident. The ship was reportedly carrying 3,800 Nissan vehicles, but the cause of the fire is still unknown.
10 March 2019	Grande America	Caught fire and sank in the Bay of Biscay, no casualties
15 May 2019	Grande Europa	Caught fire close to Mallorca; no casualties.
15 June 2019	Diamond Highway	Caught fire in the South China Sea, with all 25 crew members abandoning ship and rescued by a bulk carrier.
9 September 2019	Golden Ray	Capsized in St. Simons Sound, no casualties. Vessel caught fire during salvage operations.
4 June 2020	Höegh Xiamen	Caught fire while docked at Blount Island, 8 JFRD firefighters were injured. Vessel required salvation by towage.
16 February 2022	Felicity Ace	Caught fire off the coast of the Azores. Crew evacuated, no casualties. Vessel eventually capsized and sunk.
18 February 2022	Euroferry Olympia	Caught fire near Diapontia Islands, northwest of Corfu while en route from Igoumenitsa, Greece to Brindisi, Italy. 11 people died.
17 March 2022	Al Salmy 6	Listed after departure Jebel Ali, and sank in the Gulf. All crew members were rescued
22 July 2022	Holiday Island	A fire broke out in the engine room just before the ferry entered Wood Islands. Over 200 people were evacuated by lifeboats and local fishermen. No casualties were reported.
5 July 2023	Grande Costa D’Avorio	Cargo fire during offloading at Newark, New Jersey, US dock; two firefighters died and six were injured.
26 July 2023	Fremantle Highway	Caught fire in the North Sea near Dutch island of Ameland. One crew member died. 24 hours later the ship was still burning.
3 June 2025	Morning Midas	Caught fire in the North Pacific Ocean 300 nautical miles (560 km) south of Alaska. All 22 of her crew were rescued by the container ship COSCO Hellas. Morning Midas sank on June 23, 2025.
