= Siem Shipping =

Norwegian shipping company

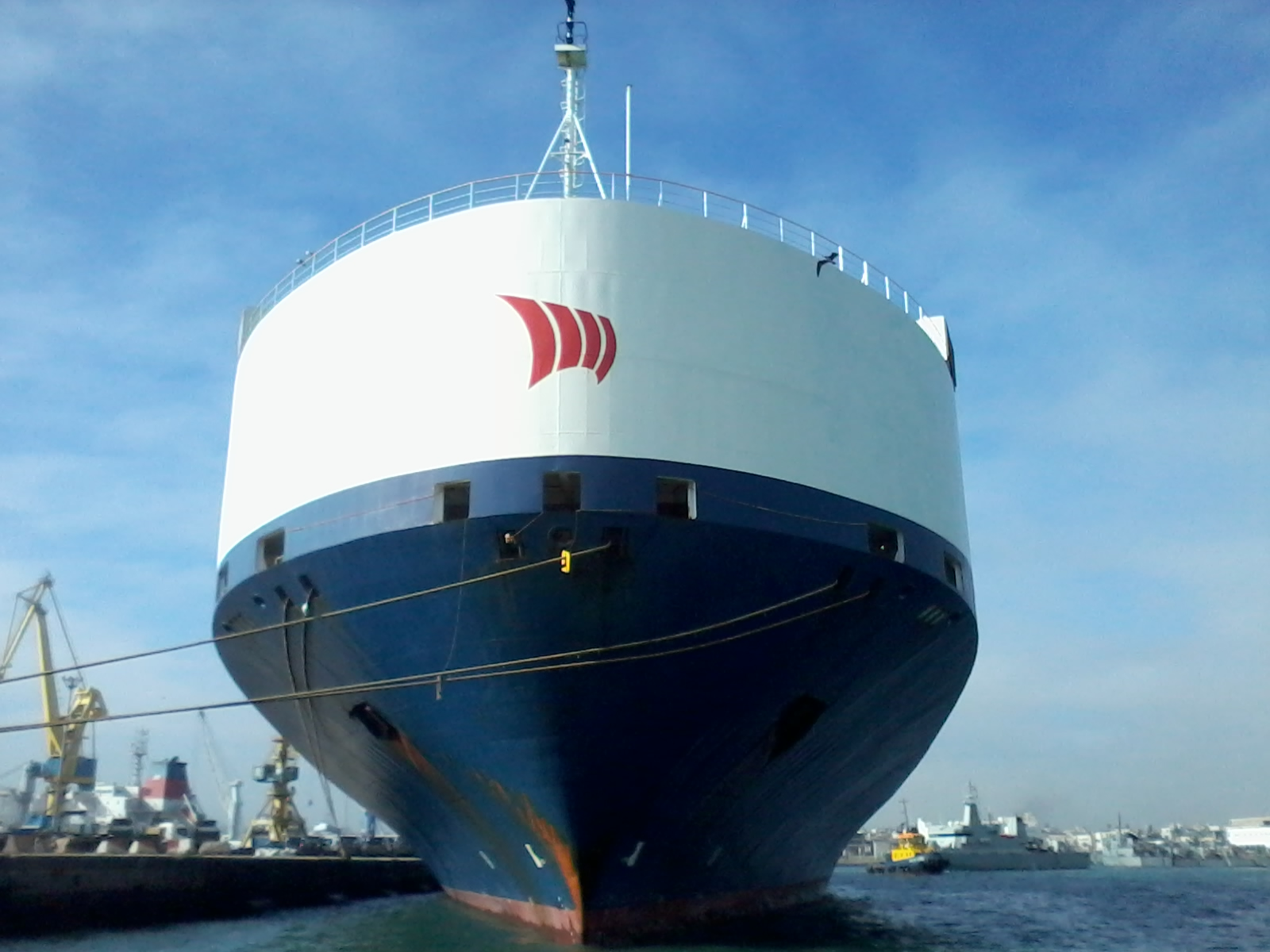

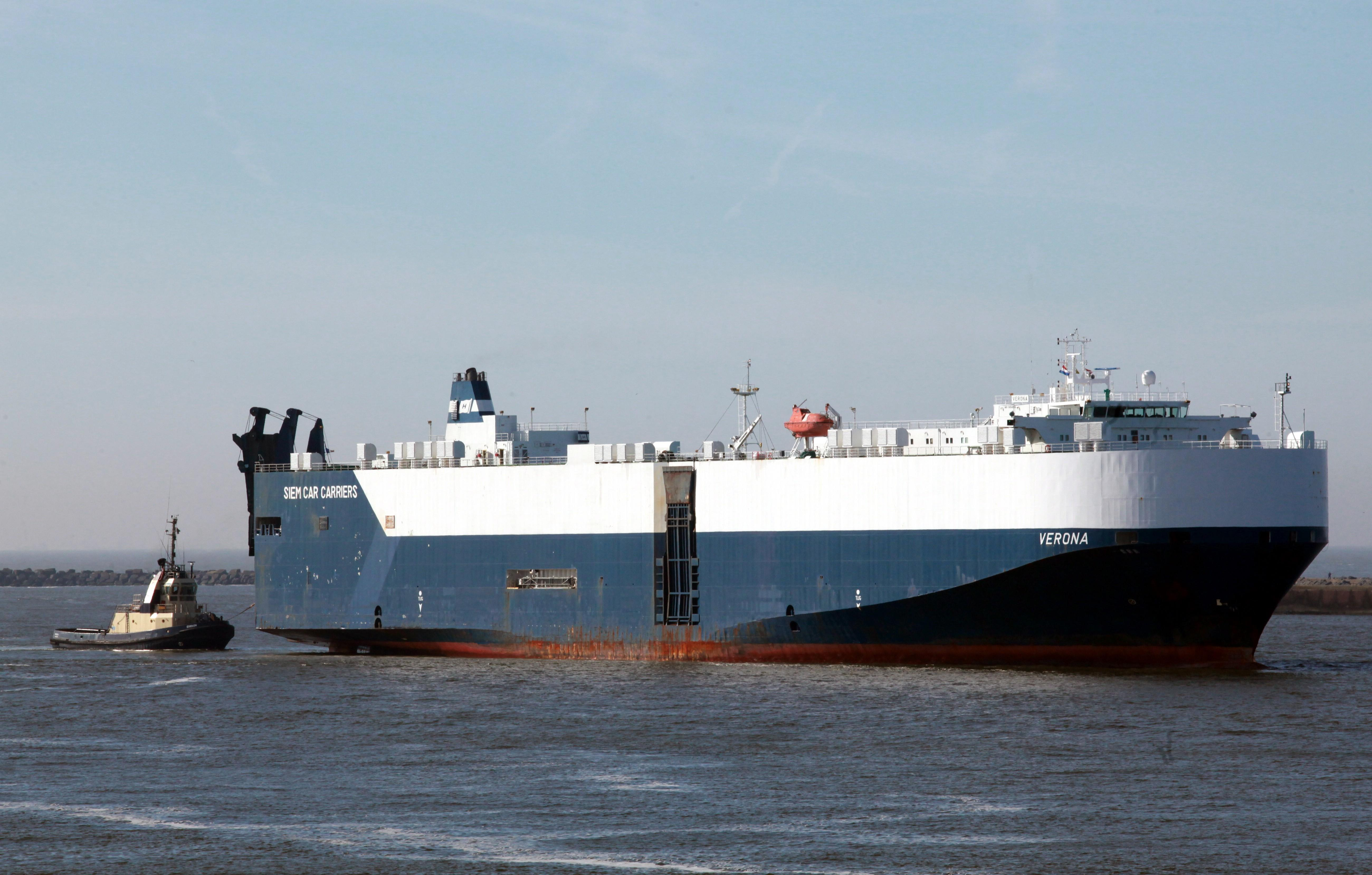
- Industry: Transport
- Founded: 2012
- Headquarters: Kristiansand, Norway
- Services: Roll-on/roll-off & shipping
- Website: www.siemshipping.com

Siem Shipping is a Norwegian shipping company based in Kristiansand, specialized in reefer, bulk and roll-on/roll-off sea carriage.

== Company overview ==
It started trading in the mid-90s as Star Reefer, before Siem Industries successfully carried out a number of acquisitions of additional smaller shipping lines (and their tonnage), renaming the whole company as Siem Shipping in 2012.

The divisions within the group are:

- Star Reefer
- Siem Bulk
- Siem Car Carriers
- Siem RORO
- Siem Ship management

== Facts ==
The company tonnage includes over 25 Reefer vessels, 8 Pure Car carriers vessels, 8 roll-on/roll-off ships, and a number of chartered bulk vessels.

The main business of the Car Carriers division consists in the maritime transport and distribution of cargo such as brand new and used automobiles, trucks, trailers, Mafi roll trailers, heavy construction machineries and further types of rolling, bulk freight and refrigerated goods.

Siem Shipping has previously announced plans to purchase and take delivery of 2 advanced newly built dual fuel LNG powered car carrier vessels. which shows Seim's firm commitment to environmental protection through the adoption of LNG bunkering practices. The first one, built at Xiamen shipyard, was delivered on 15 November 2019 and named MV Siem Confucius. The second one, MV Siem Aristotle, had the maiden deployment fixed for January 2020. Both vessels are intended to sail on a dedicated loop service, transporting Volkswagen cars manufactured in Europe and Mexico.

Additionally Siem Offshore operates a fleet of about 30 specialized Platform, Supply, Intervention and tug ships.

== See also ==
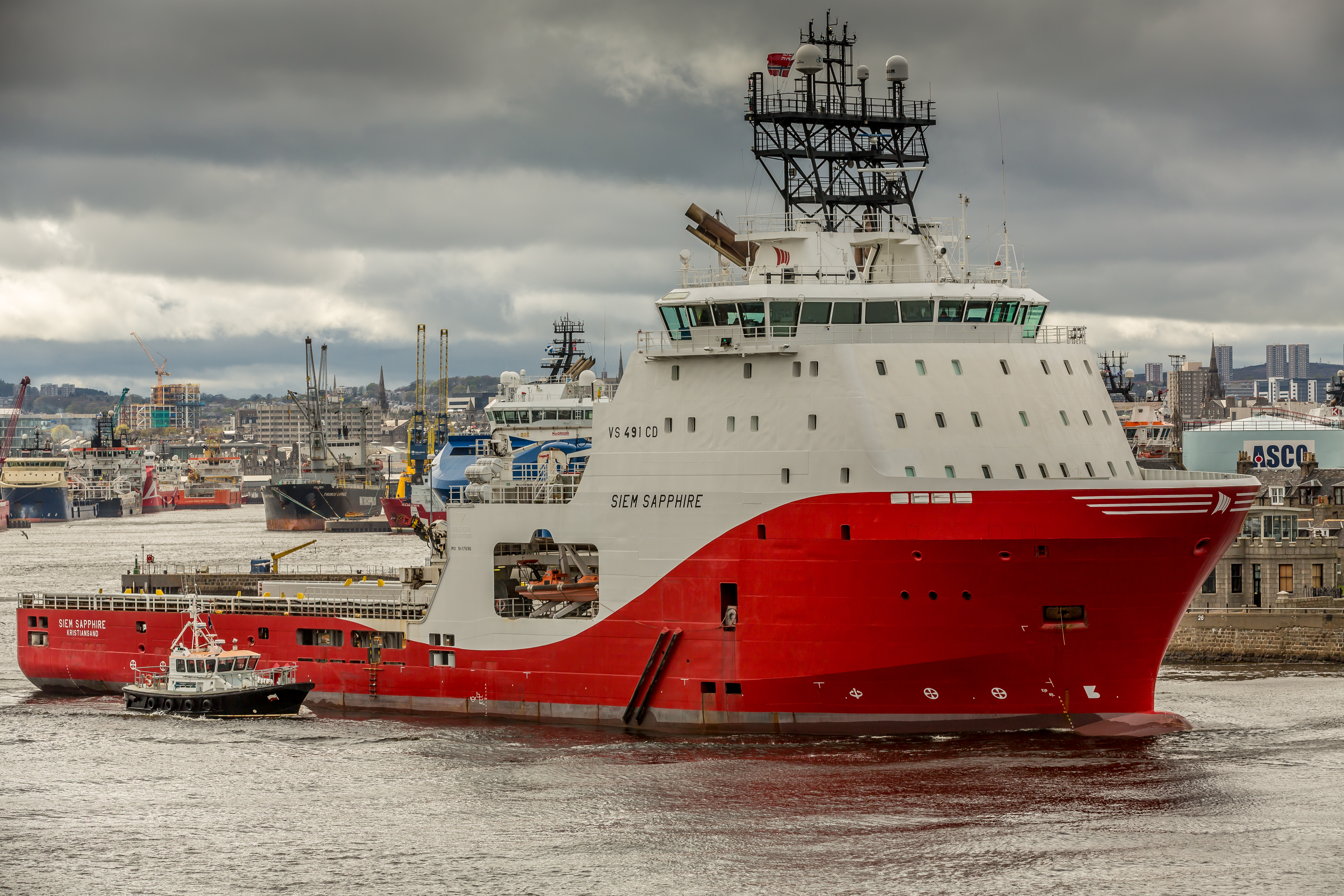
mv Siem Sapphire

- American Roll-on Roll-off Carrier
- K Line European Sea Highway Services
- Nippon Yusen Kaisha
- Toyofuji Shipping
- United European Car Carriers
