= Euro Marine Logistics =

Shipping and logistics company

Euro Marine Logistics NV

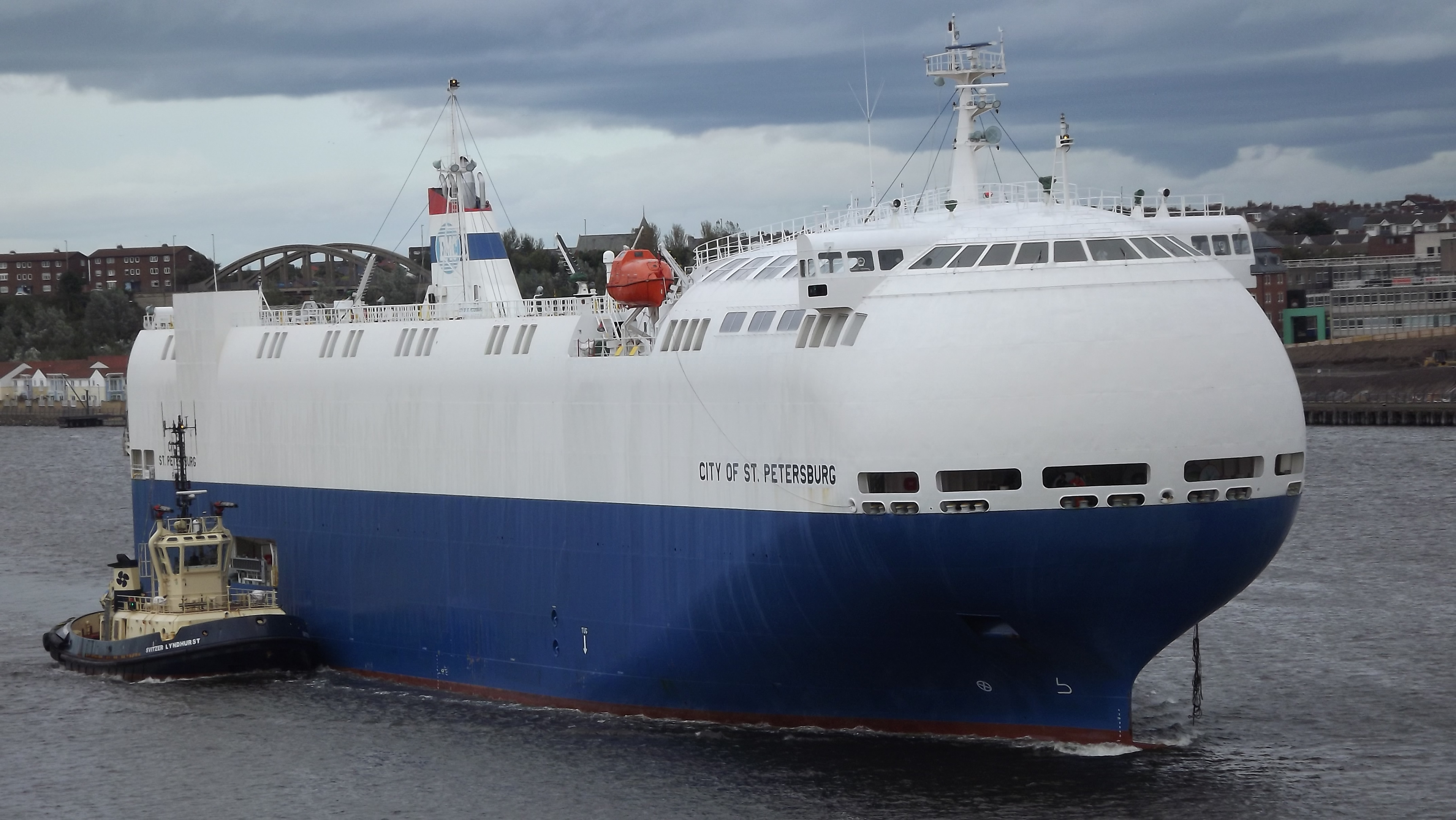
- Type: Public Anonymous Venture (N.V.)
- Industry: Roll-on/roll-off shipping
- Predecessor: Euro Marine Carrier B.V.
- Founded: 2011
- Headquarters: Romeinsesteenweg 468, 1853 Strombeek-Bever, Belgium
- Number of locations: 27 offices/agencies in 17 countries
- Area served: Mediterranean Sea; North Sea; Baltic Sea
- Key people: Marc Pauwels (Managing Director)
- Parent: Mitsui OSK Lines
- Website: euro-marine.eu

Euro Marine Logistics NV (EML) was a European short sea roll-on/roll-off shipping and logistics company, with headquarters in Brussels, Belgium. It was originally jointly owned by Mitsui O.S.K. Lines and Höegh Autoliners, before MOL acquired full ownership in December 2019, and then absorbed the brand in April 2024.

== History ==
In 1990, Euro Marine Carrier B.V. (EMC) was established in Amsterdam, Netherlands by three partners, Nissan Motor Car Carrier (51%), Mitsui O.S.K. Lines (24.5%) and Höegh Autoliners (24.5%).

In 2011, after a change in share ownership, the assets of EMC were transferred to Euro Marine Logistics, which was based in Wemmel, Belgium as a venture between Mitsui O.S.K. Lines and Hoegh Autoliners.

The company used to specialize in the domestic maritime transport and distribution of cargo such as automobiles, trucks, trailers, Mafi roll trailers, heavy construction machineries and further types of rolling freight.

On 1 April 2024, ceased to exist as an independent brand, and was fully integrated into the mother company Mitsui O.S.K. Lines.

== Fleet ==
EML operated a fleet of fifteen ships with capacity of 33,000 CEU on six shipping routes. It served 27 commercial ports in 17 different countries, operating in the Mediterranean Sea, North Sea and Baltic Sea. The company transported 950,000 CEU in 2015.

== Environment ==
Short sea shipping is the most ecological and cheapest mode of transportation. EML used ultra-low-sulfur diesel, while being part of the Trident Alliance.

== Facts and accidents ==
On 5 December 2012, EML suffered the worst accident up to date, when a vessel of its fleet, the Baltic Ace, sank in the North Sea after a collision with the Cyprus-registered container ship Corvus J, and 11 Crew members died.

On 3 December 2015, EML operated City of Rotterdam collided with another roll-on/roll-off vessel - the Primula Seaways, reporting severe hull damages and requiring urgent repair work. The vessel was departing Rotterdam when the accident happened. The harbour pilot and Captain on board were both investigated, and finally given a four month prison sentence.

== See also ==
- United European Car Carriers
- Nissan Motor Car Carrier
- KESS - K Line Europe Short Sea
- Toyofuji Shipping
- Nippon Yusen Kaisha

== Ships gallery ==
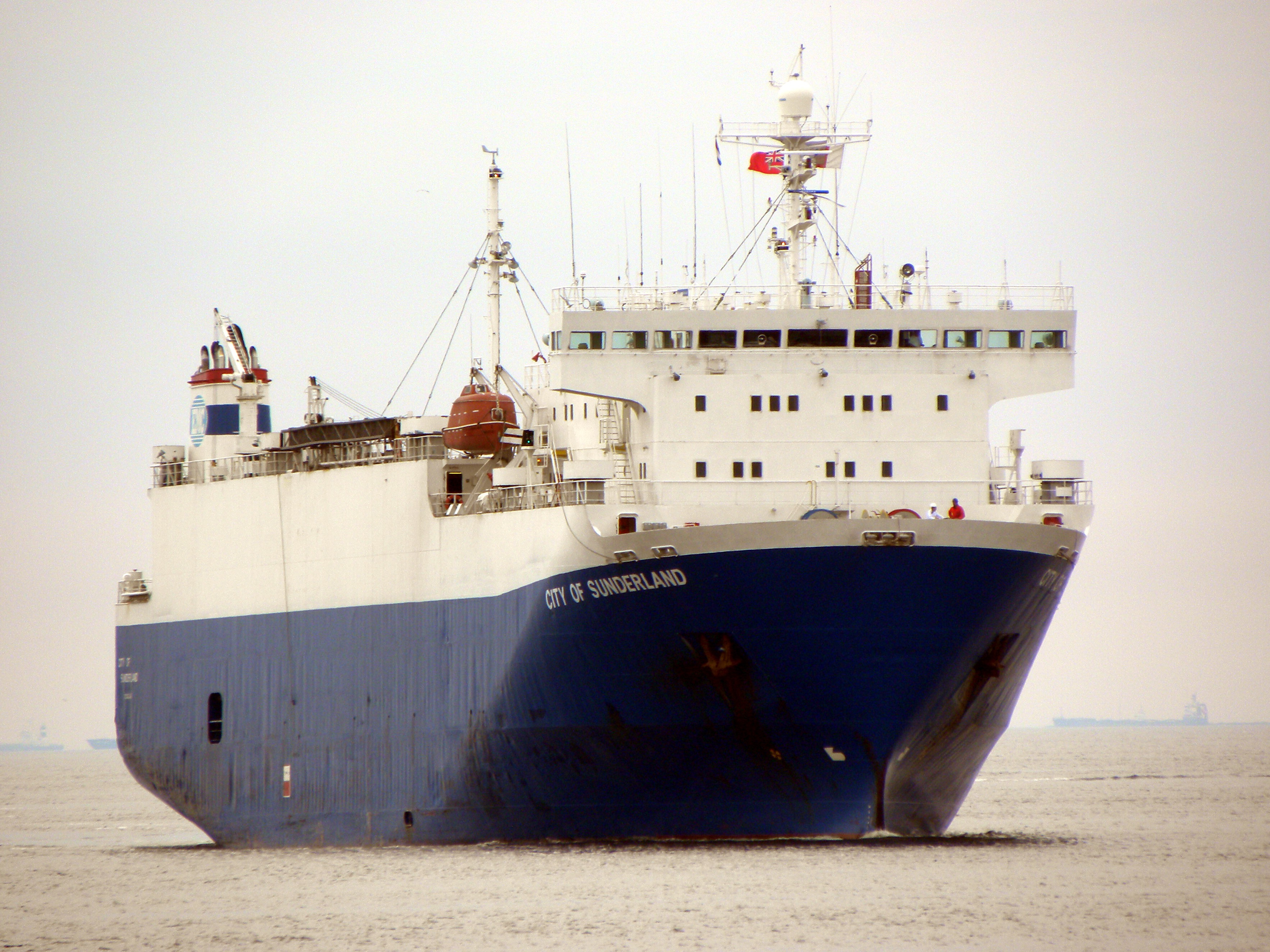
mv City of Sunderland

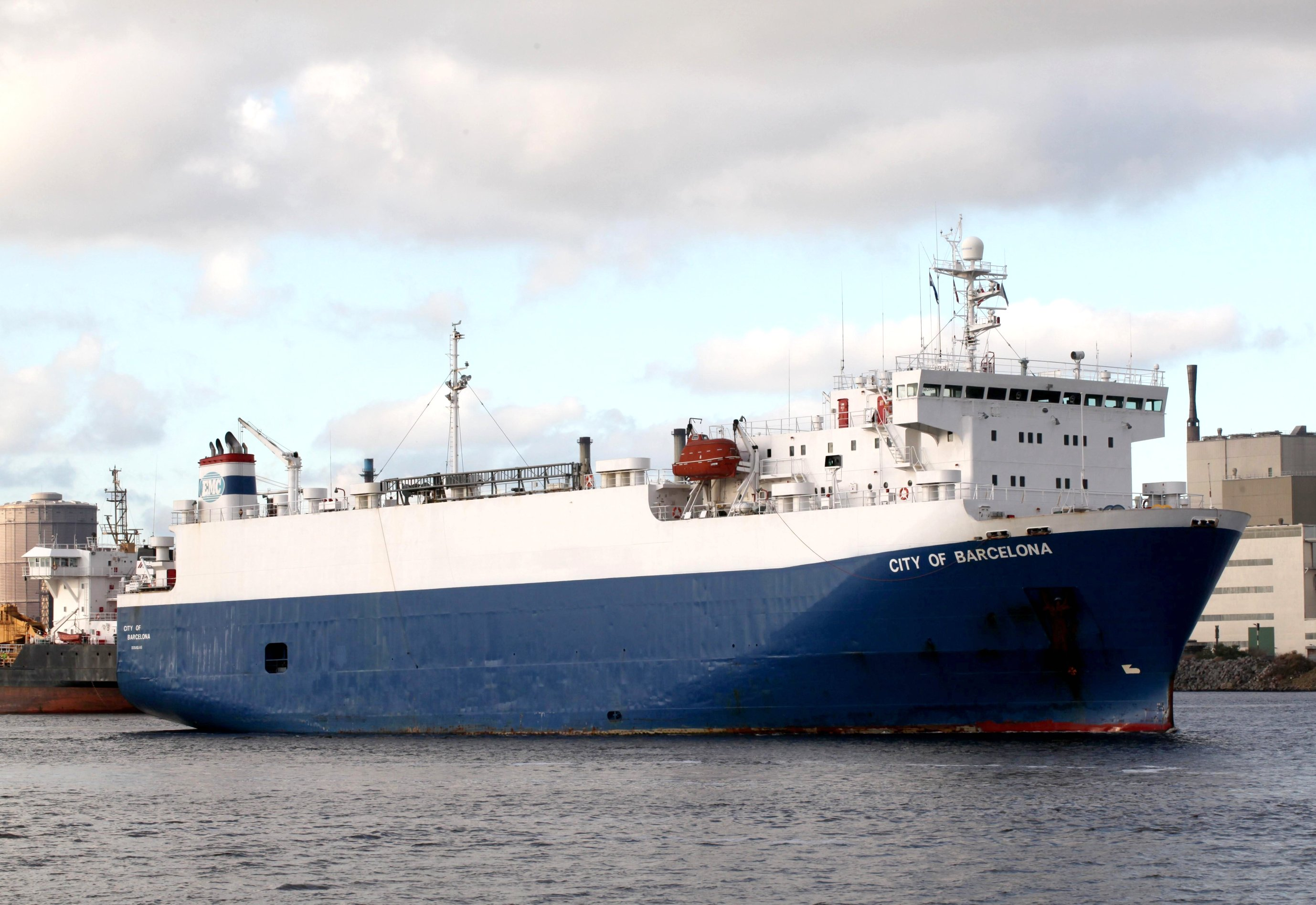
mv City of Barcelona

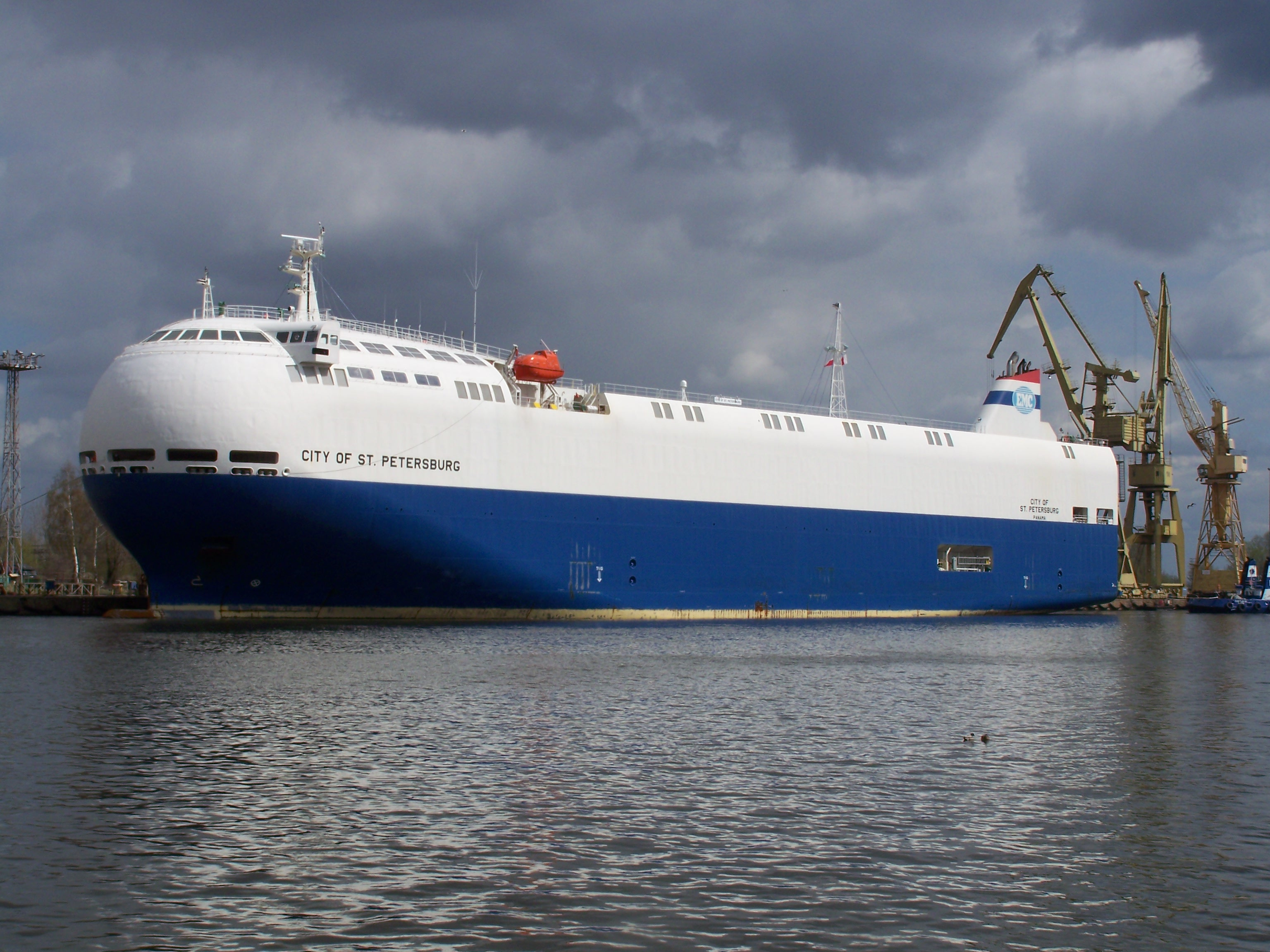
mv City of St.Petersburg

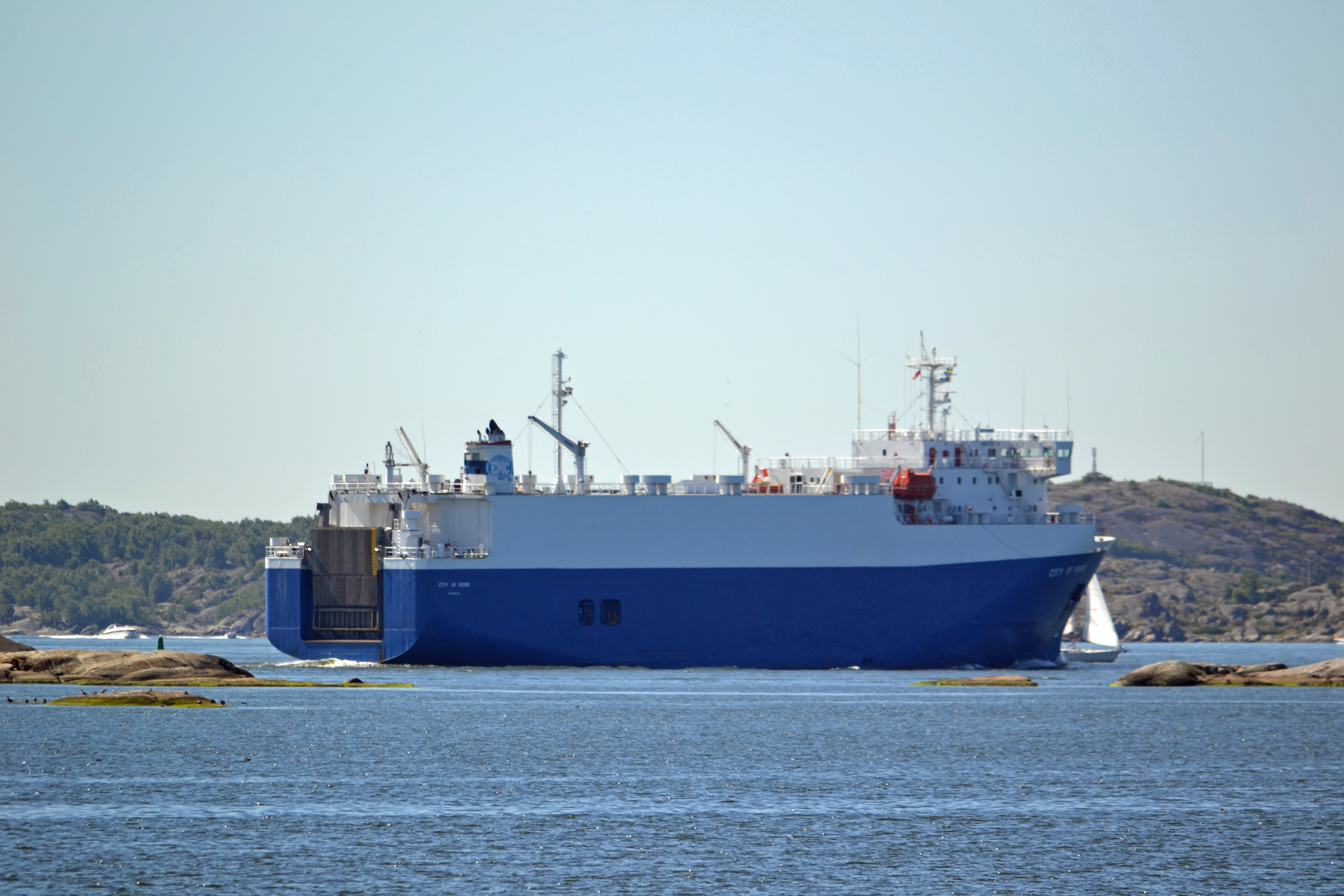
mv City of Rome

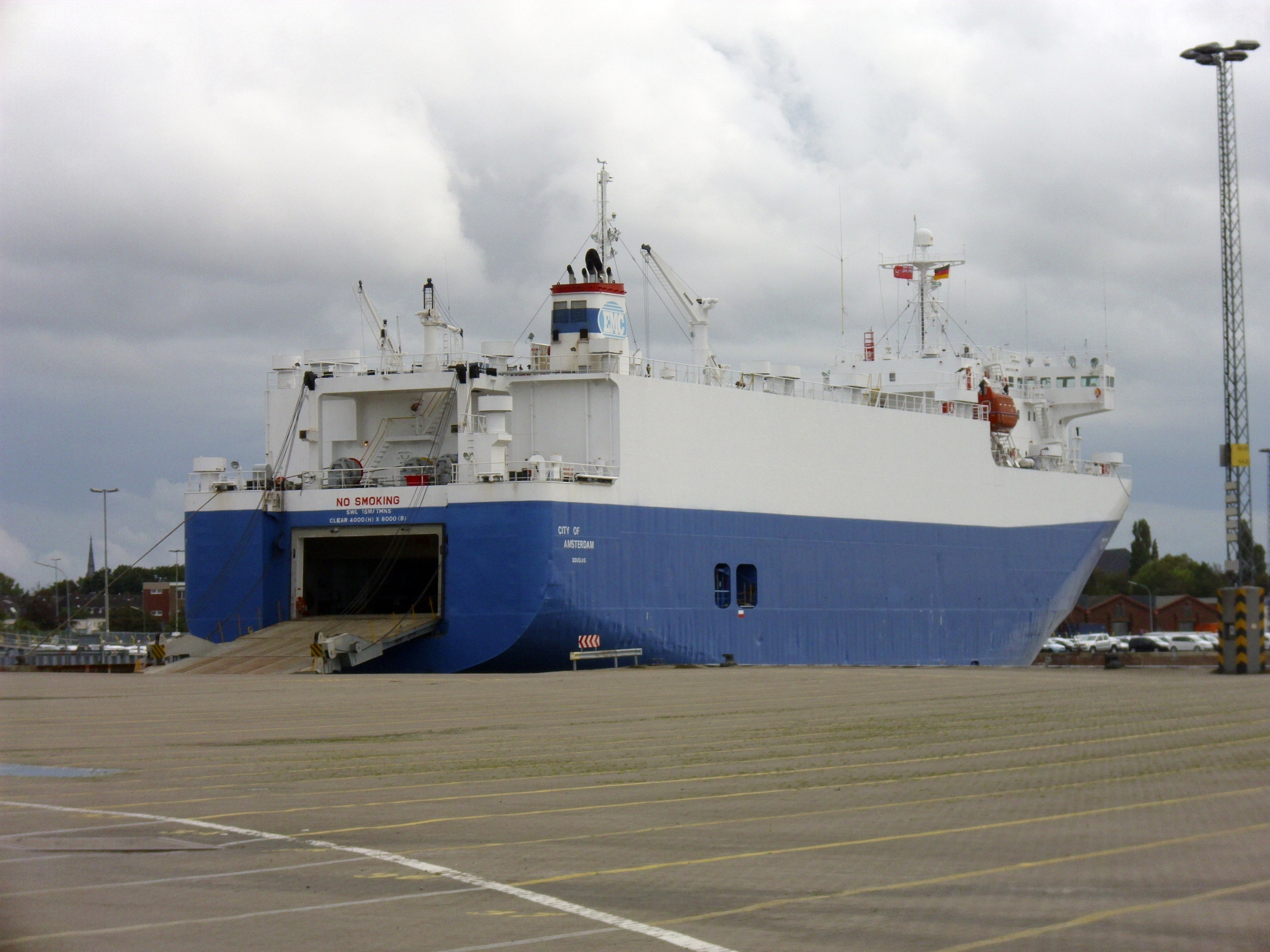
mv City of Amsterdam

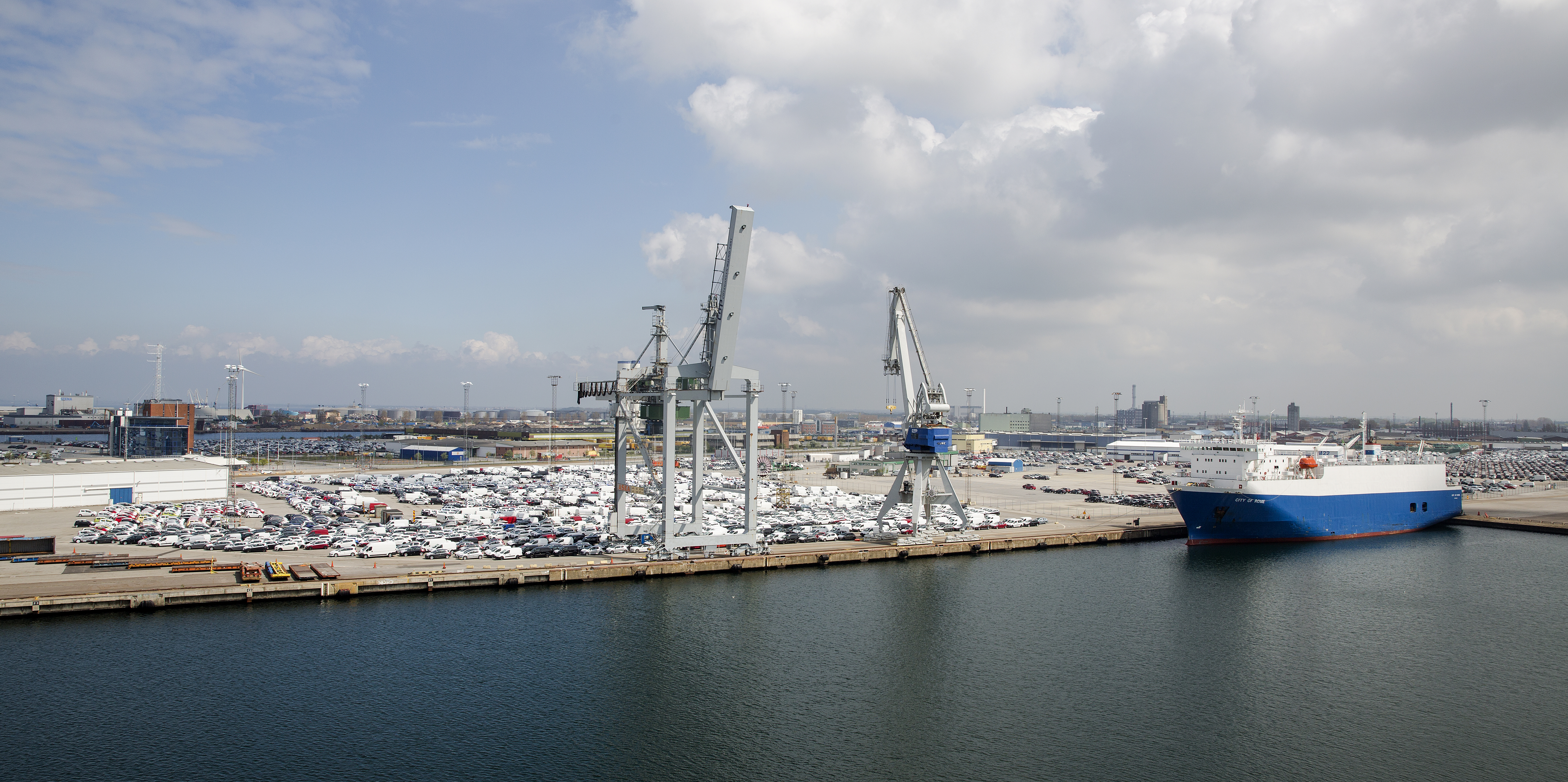
EML ship
