= Baltic Ace =

Bahamian-flagged car carrier

Coordinates: 51.8376°N 2.8866°E

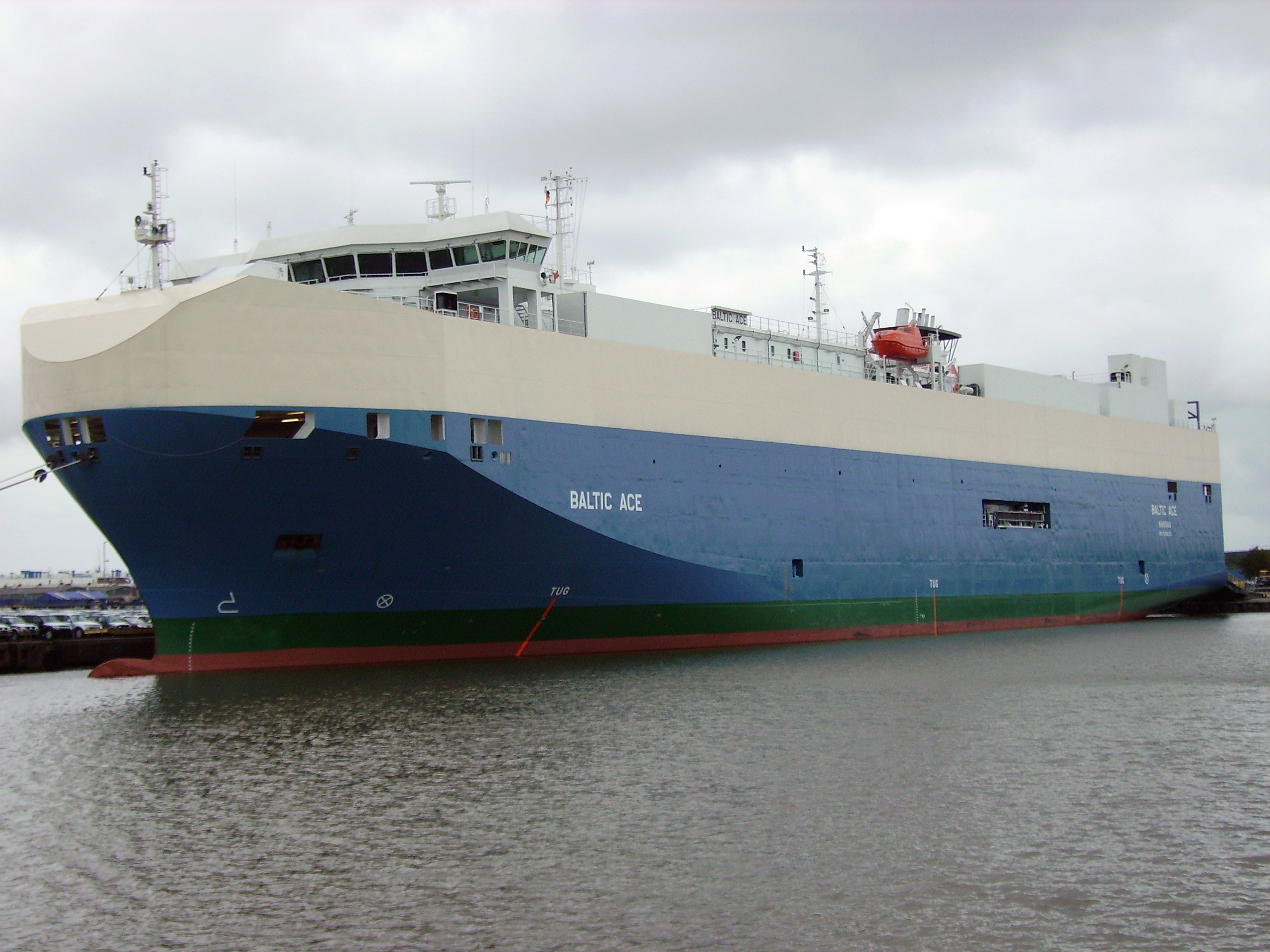
- Baltic Ace

History
- Name: Baltic Ace
- Owner: Baltic Highway Limited (Ray Car Carriers Ltd), Isle of Man
- Operator: Euro Marine Logistics, Brussels/United European Car Carriers, Oslo
- Port of registry: Nassau, Bahamas
- Ordered: 23 December 2005
- Builder: Stocznia Gdynia, Poland
- Yard number: 8245/5
- Laid down: 26 February 2007
- Launched: 3 June 2007
- Completed: 11 July 2007
- In service: 2007–2012
- Out of service: 5 December 2012
- Identification: Call sign: C6WE8; IMO number: 9386213; MMSI number: 309474000
- Fate: Sank on 5 December 2012

General characteristics
- Type: Car carrier
- Tonnage: 23,498 GT; 7,050 NT; 7,787 DWT
- Length: 148.0 m (486 ft)
- Beam: 25.03 m (82 ft)
- Draft: 7.9 m (26 ft)
- Depth: 11.8 m (39 ft) (main deck); 25.20 m (83 ft) (upper deck)
- Decks: Six fixed, two hoistable
- Ramps: Stern ramp and stern quarter ramp
- Ice class: 1A
- Installed power: MAN-B&W 7S46MC-C (9,170 kW)
- Propulsion: Single shaft; fixed-pitch propeller*Bow and stern thrusters
- Speed: 18.9 knots (35.0 km/h; 21.7 mph)
- Capacity: 2,132 cars (RT43)
- Crew: 20–24

Baltic Ace was a Bahamian-flagged car carrier, that sank in the North Sea on 5 December 2012 after a collision with the Cyprus-registered container ship Corvus J. Built by Stocznia Gdynia in Poland, the ship had been in service since 2007.

== Description ==
Baltic Ace was a car carrier, a roll-on/roll-off ship designed to transport vehicles in a large, fully enclosed garage-like superstructure running the entire length and width of the vessel. She had eight cargo decks with a minimum free height of 2 metres (6.6 ft). Two decks (3 and 5) could be hoisted up to increase the clearance of the decks below to 4.8 metres (16 ft) for large vehicles. Her car capacity, measured in RT43 units, was 2,132. For loading and unloading cargo, Baltic Ace had a stern ramp for normal ro-ro (roll-on/roll-off) berths and a stern quarter ramp for harbours with no specialized cargo handling facilities.

Baltic Ace was 148 metres (486 ft) long and had a beam of 25 metres (82 ft). Fully laden, she drew 7.9 metres (26 ft) of water and had a deadweight tonnage of 7,787 tons. Like most ships of her kind, she was propelled by a single 5.84-metre (19.2 ft) nickel-aluminum alloy fixed pitch propeller directly coupled to the main engine. Her prime mover, a 7-cylinder MAN-B&W 7S46MC-C low-speed crosshead diesel engine, had an output of 9,710 kW (13,020 hp) at 129 rpm.

She had three 7-cylinder MAN-B&W Holeby 7L23/30 auxiliary engines for onboard electricity generation, each with an output of 1,120 kW. For manoeuvering at ports, she had a 1,000 kW transverse bow thruster and another 660 kW thruster in the stern, both manufactured by ABB.

Calling ports in the Baltic Sea regularly, Baltic Ace was strengthened for navigation in ice and held a Finnish-Swedish ice class 1A. She was classed by Det Norske Veritas.

== Career ==
Baltic Ace was of a standard design offered by Stocznia Gdynia, the fifth of six relatively small car carriers built in 2005–2007. Her sister ships are Elbe Highway, Thames Highway, Danube Highway, Seine Highway and Nordic Ace.

The contract for the construction of the vessel was signed on 23 December 2005 and she was laid down at Stocznia Gdynia in Poland on 26 February 2007. Launched on 4 June 2007, Baltic Ace was delivered to her owners on 11 July 2007.

The vessel was under long time charter with Euro Marine Logistics, on a regular loop service calling Europe north continent and Baltic ports.

== Sinking ==
On 5 December 2012, Baltic Ace collided with the Cyprus-registered container ship Corvus J in the North Sea while underway from Zeebrugge, Belgium, to Kotka, Finland with a cargo of about 1,400 Mitsubishi cars headed for the Russian market. The incident took place some 40–50 kilometres (25–31 mi) off the Dutch coast south of Rotterdam on one of the busiest shipping lanes in the world at 18:15 GMT. According to a representative of the shipping company, the cause of the accident was likely a human error.

After the collision, Baltic Ace began taking on water, capsized and sank within 15 minutes in shallow waters. According to the ship's manager, Corvus J likely hit Baltic Ace on the side, where void tanks forming a double side are only 1.3 metres (4.3 ft) wide, quickly flooding the cargo decks. Corvus J was severely damaged and her bulbous bow was bent, but she was not in danger of sinking and participated in the search for survivors.

The weather conditions, three-metre waves and snow, made the rescue operation difficult. As the search for survivors resumed on the following day, five members of the 24-person crew had been confirmed dead and six were still missing. Thirteen crew members, including the ship's Polish captain, were winched to safety from liferafts by helicopters or picked up by nearby ships. According to Netherlands Coast Guard, the chance of finding more survivors was "virtually zero" and the search for the missing crew members, who might have been trapped inside the wreck, was called off on the day following the accident.

The number of casualties was at last confirmed, when 11 Crew members were reported as dead.

After the sinking, a number of news reports featured a photograph of a sunken vessel incorrectly identified as Baltic Ace. The similarly-coloured wreck, visible through the surface in shallow water, was in fact Asia Malaysia, a Philippine ferry that sank in 2011.

== Salvage operation ==
Resting at a depth of only 35 metres (115 ft) in the busy shipping lanes near the port of Rotterdam, with approximately 540,000 litres (140,000 US gal) of fuel oil remaining inside the hull, the wreck of the Baltic Ace was both a danger to shipping and an environmental hazard.

In March 2014, Rijkswaterstaat awarded contract for the complete removal of the sunken car carrier to the Dutch company Royal Boskalis and its partner Mammoet. Once all remaining oil had been removed from the wreck, the vessel was cut into 8 separate pieces using a cutting wire and raised from the seabed. The same method was previously used in the salvage of MV Tricolor, a car carrier that sank in the English Channel in 2002, and to remove the bow of the Russian submarine Kursk before the rest of the hull was raised.

The recovery of the wreck was completed in September 2015.

== See also ==
- Tricolor, car carrier that sank in December 2002
- List of roll-on/roll-off vessel accidents

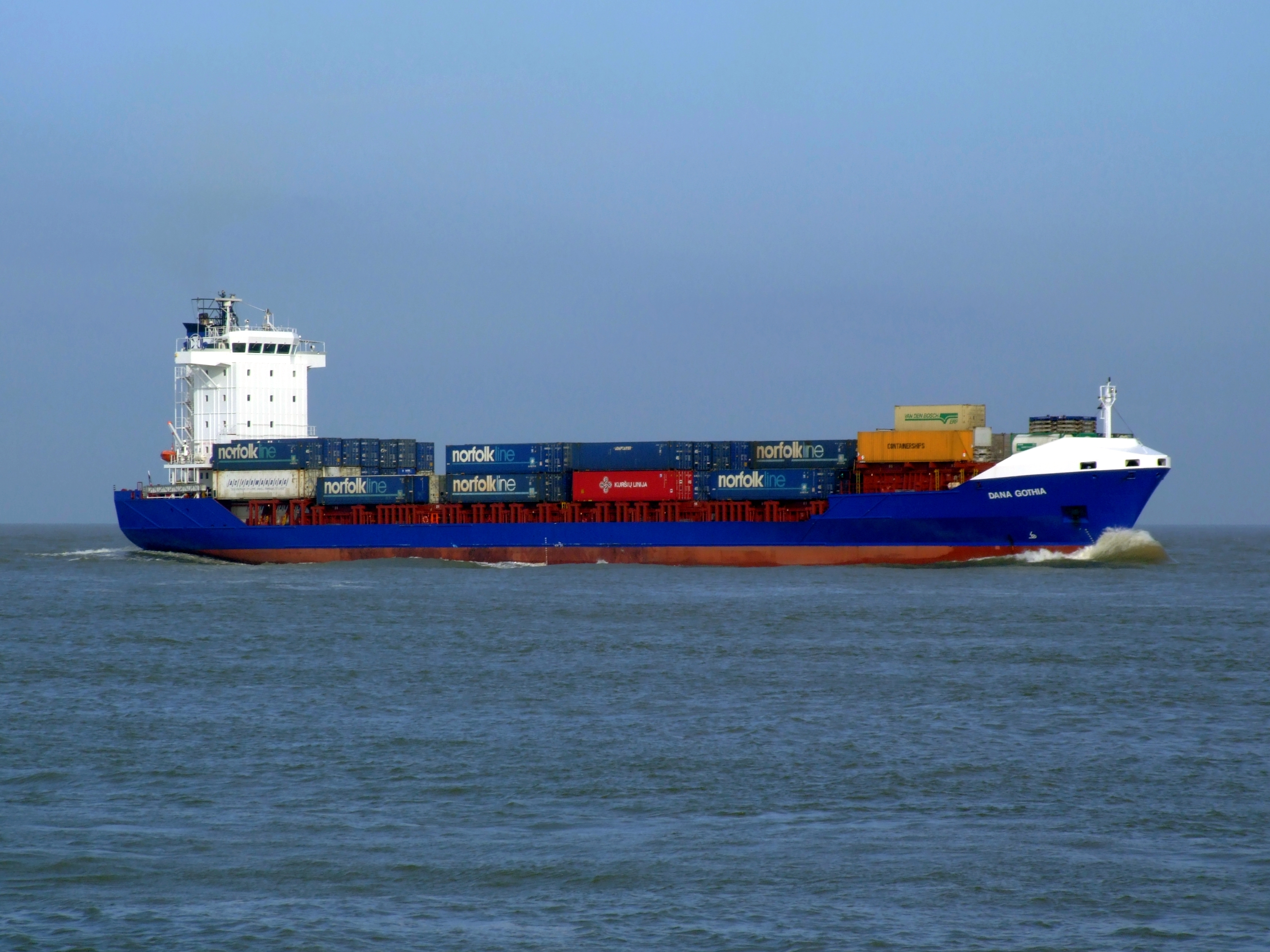
Corvus J, formerly Dana Gothia, collided with Baltic Ace on 5 December 2012.

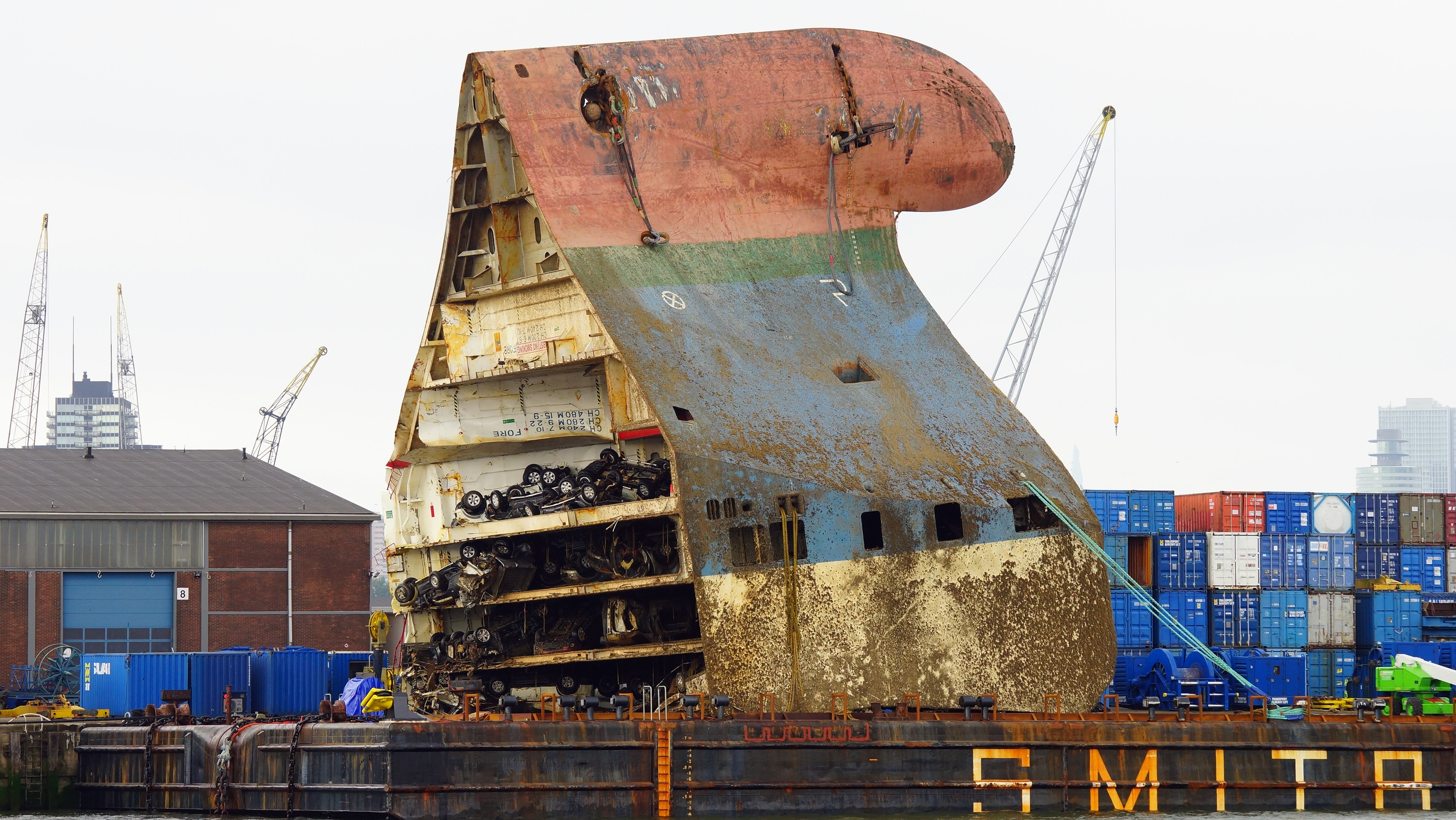
The bow of Baltic Ace in Waalhaven, Rotterdam in 2015
