= Nissan Motor Car Carrier =

Shipping company

Nissan Motor Car Carrier Co., Ltd 日産専用船株式会社
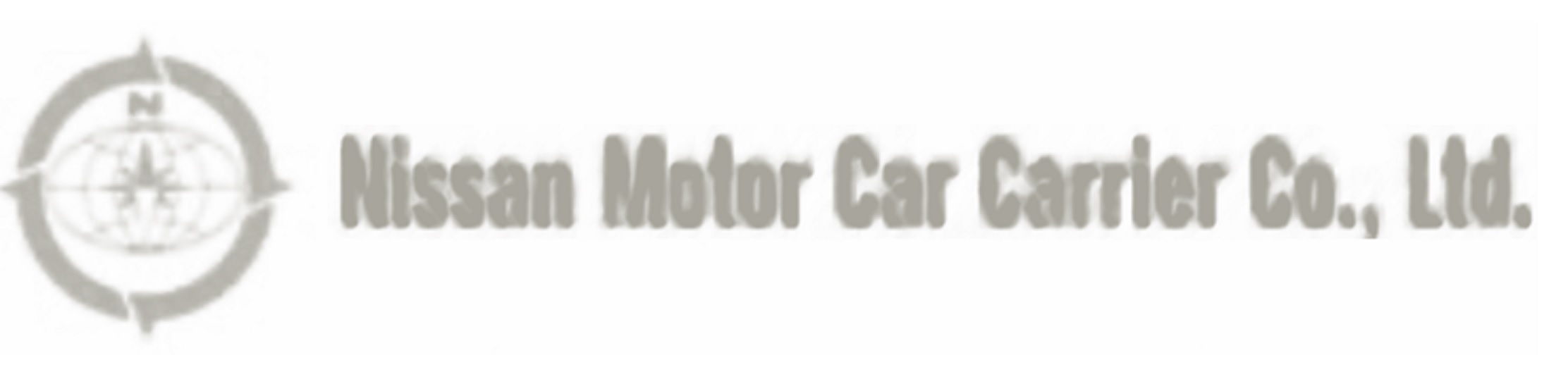

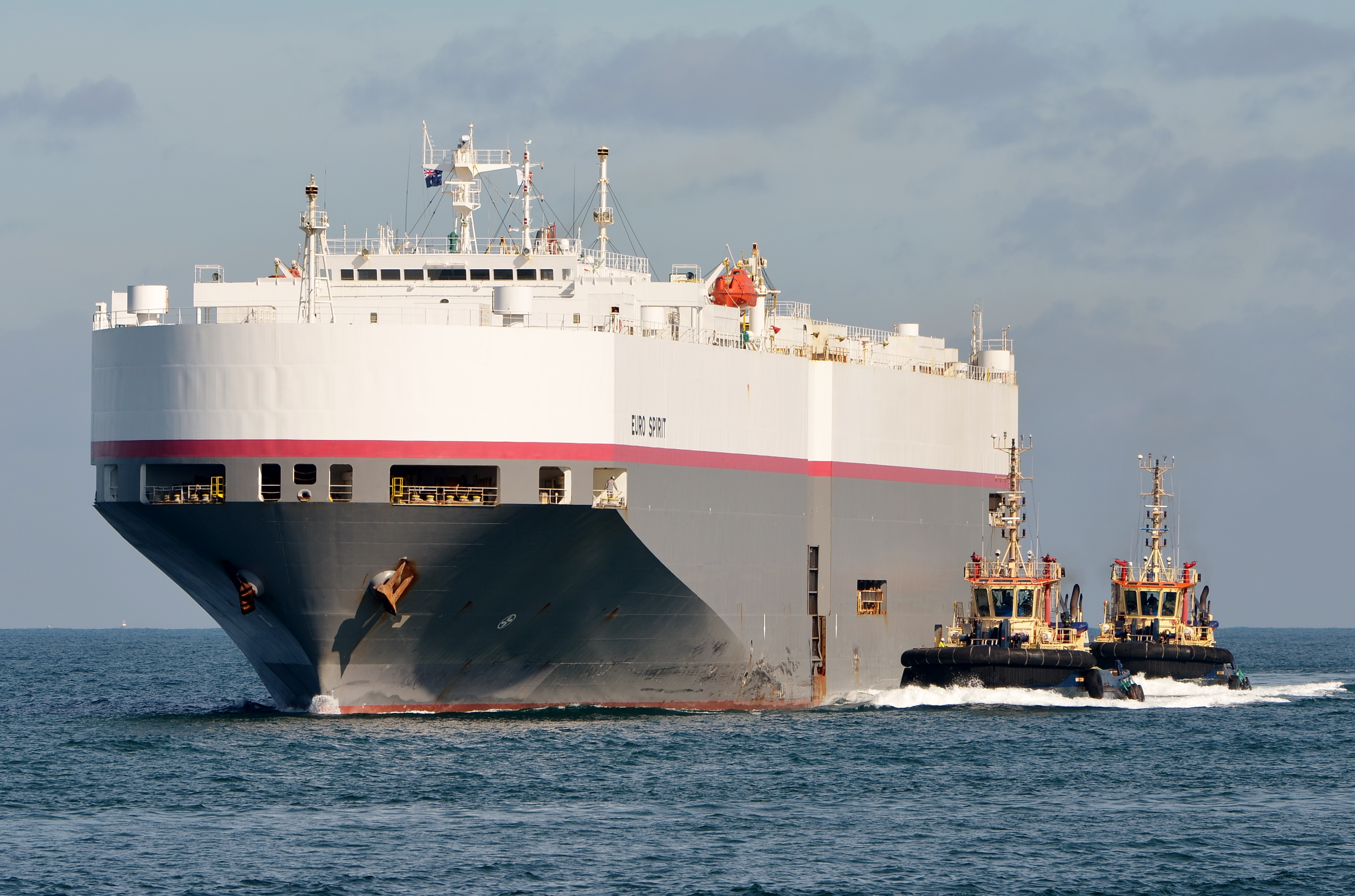
- Industry: Transport
- Founded: 1965
- Headquarters: Chūō, Tokyo, Japan
- Number of employees: 72
- Website: www.nissancarrier.co.jp

Nissan Motor Car Carrier Co., Ltd. (Abbreviation: NMCC; Japanese: 日産専用船株式会社, romanized: Nissan Senyōsen Kabushiki-gaisha) is a Japanese roll-on/roll-off shipping company owned by Nissan Motors (60%) and Mitsui O.S.K. Lines (40%).

== Overview ==
The company fleet includes 9 deep sea Car carrier vessels, each one with a gross tonnage between 46,000 and 60,000 GT.

The main business is the sea carriage of new Nissan and sister brands vehicles manufactured in Japan and Mexico, all over the world and specifically to US, Europe, intra Asia and Middle East.

Its subsidiary, Euro Marine Carrier is a short sea operator in Europe, also in charge of carrying Nissan models to more peripheral European ports, not directly called by NMCC.

NMCC also has a cooperative business relationship with the Norwegian shipping company, Höegh Autoliners.

In Europe, Port of Amsterdam is used as the home port for all main discharging and transhipment activities of imported and exported Nissan cars.

In August 2017 a large fine was applied by the South Korean Fair Trade Commission against Mitsui O.S.K. Lines and Nissan Motor Car Carrier for antitrust law violation.

== Select list of ships ==
This is a dynamic list and may never be able to satisfy particular standards for completeness. You can help by expanding it with reliably sourced entries.

- Asian Spirit
- Jupiter Spirit
- Leo Spirit
- Nordic Spirit
- Pleiades Spirit
- Venus Spirit
- World Spirit
- United Spirit
- Luna Spirit
- Andromeda Spirit

== See also ==
- United European Car Carriers
- KESS - K Line Europe Short Sea
- Euro Marine Logistics
- Toyofuji Shipping
- Nippon Yusen Kaisha

== Fleet gallery ==
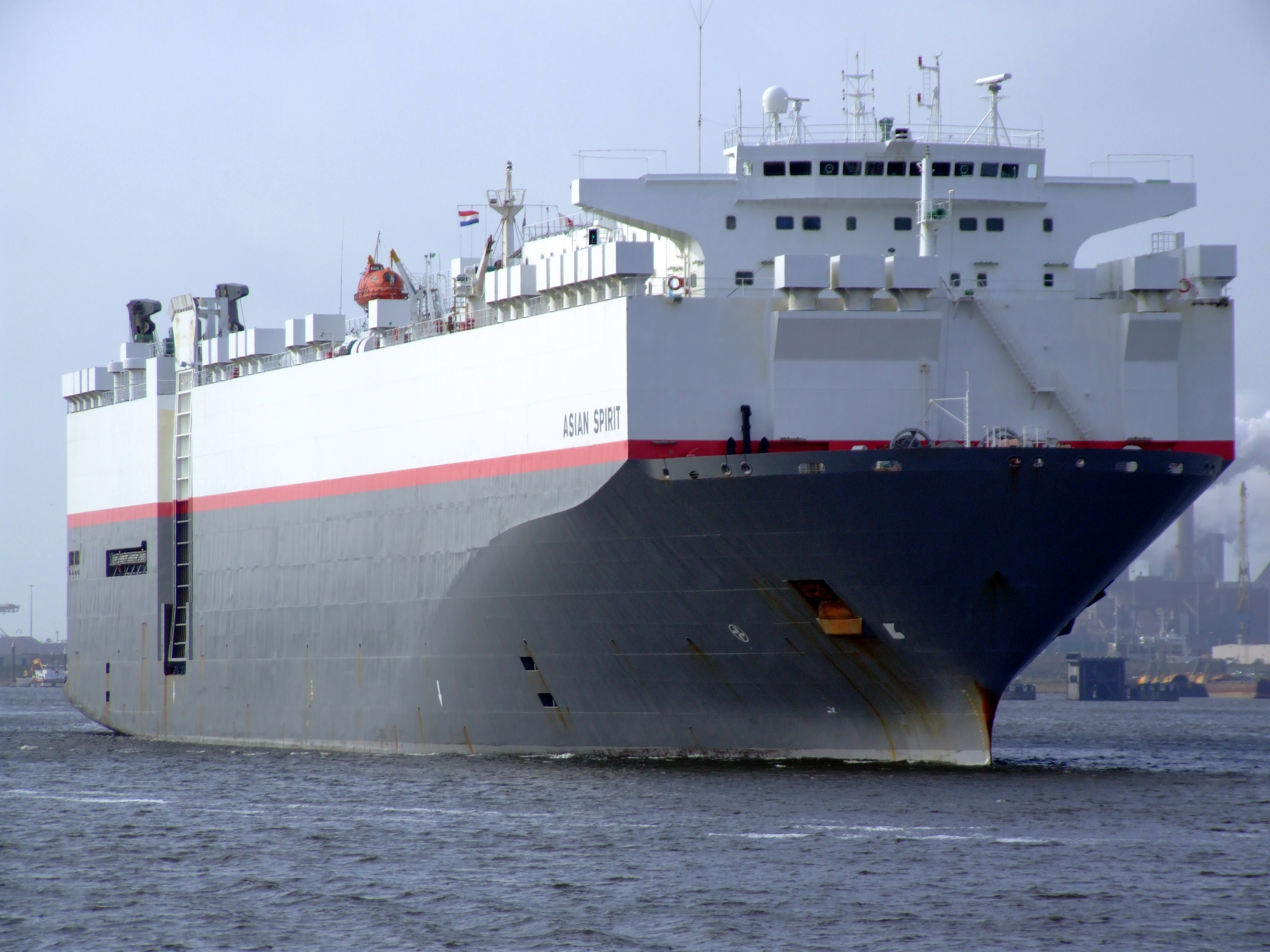
mv Asian Spirit

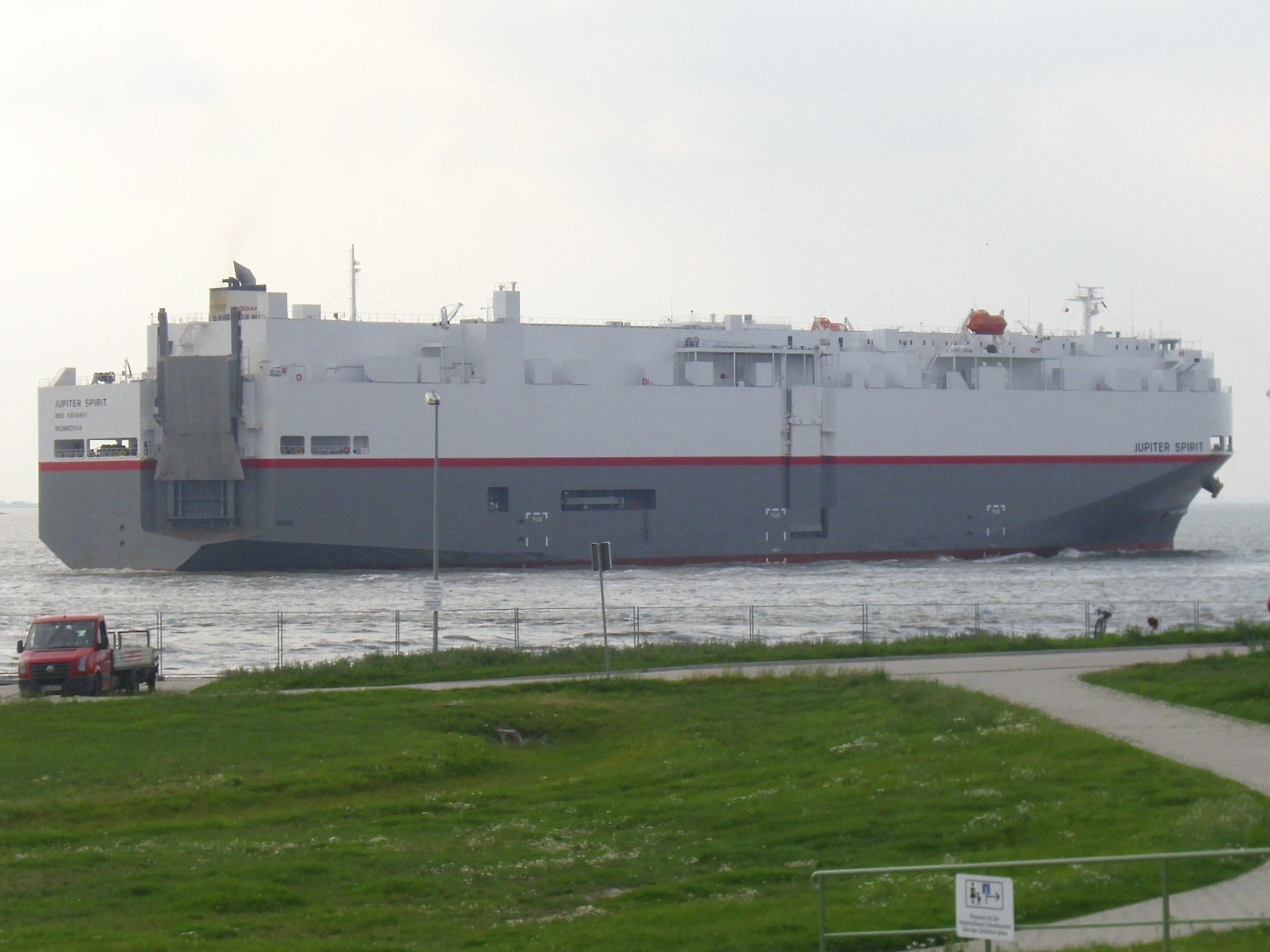
mv Jupiter Spirit

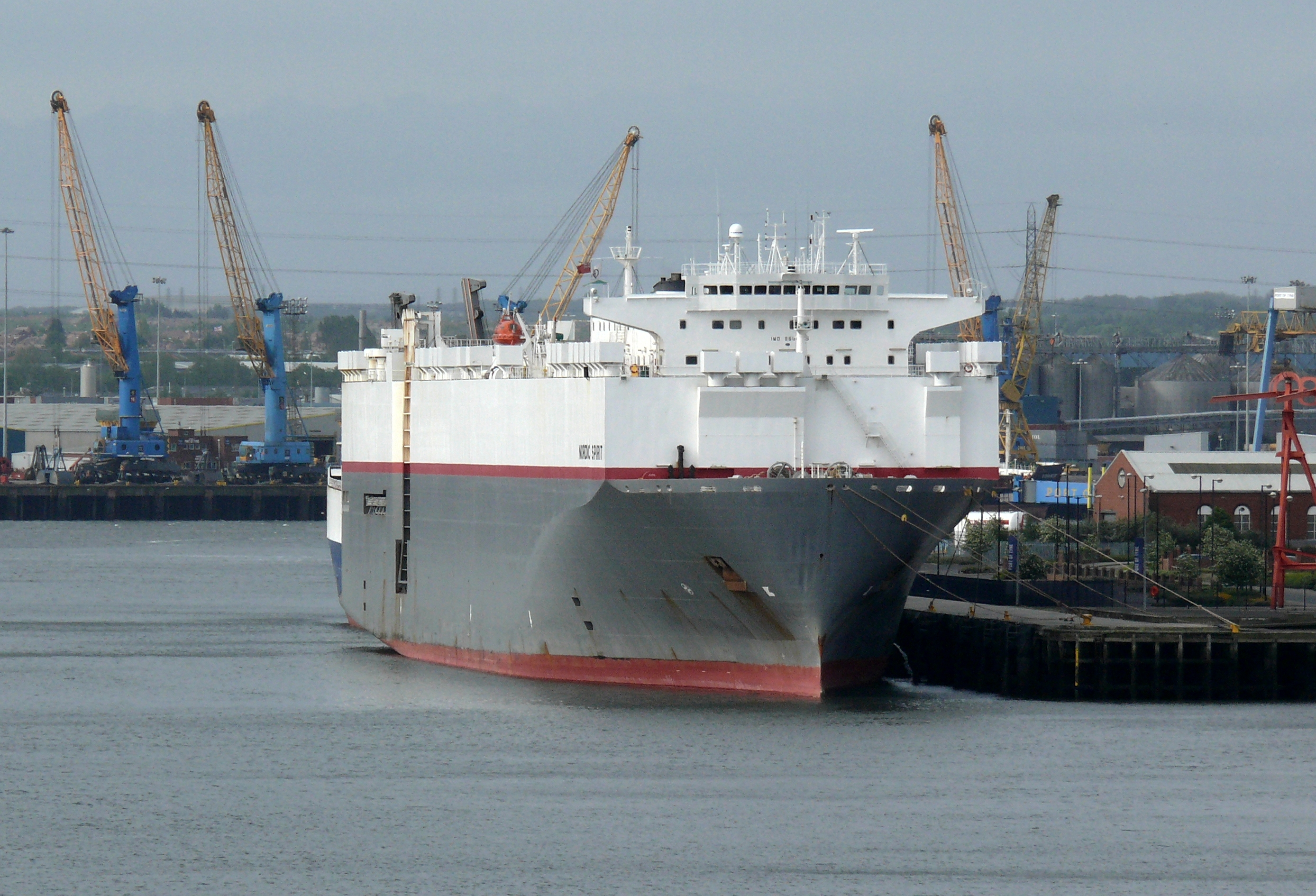
mv Nordic Spirit

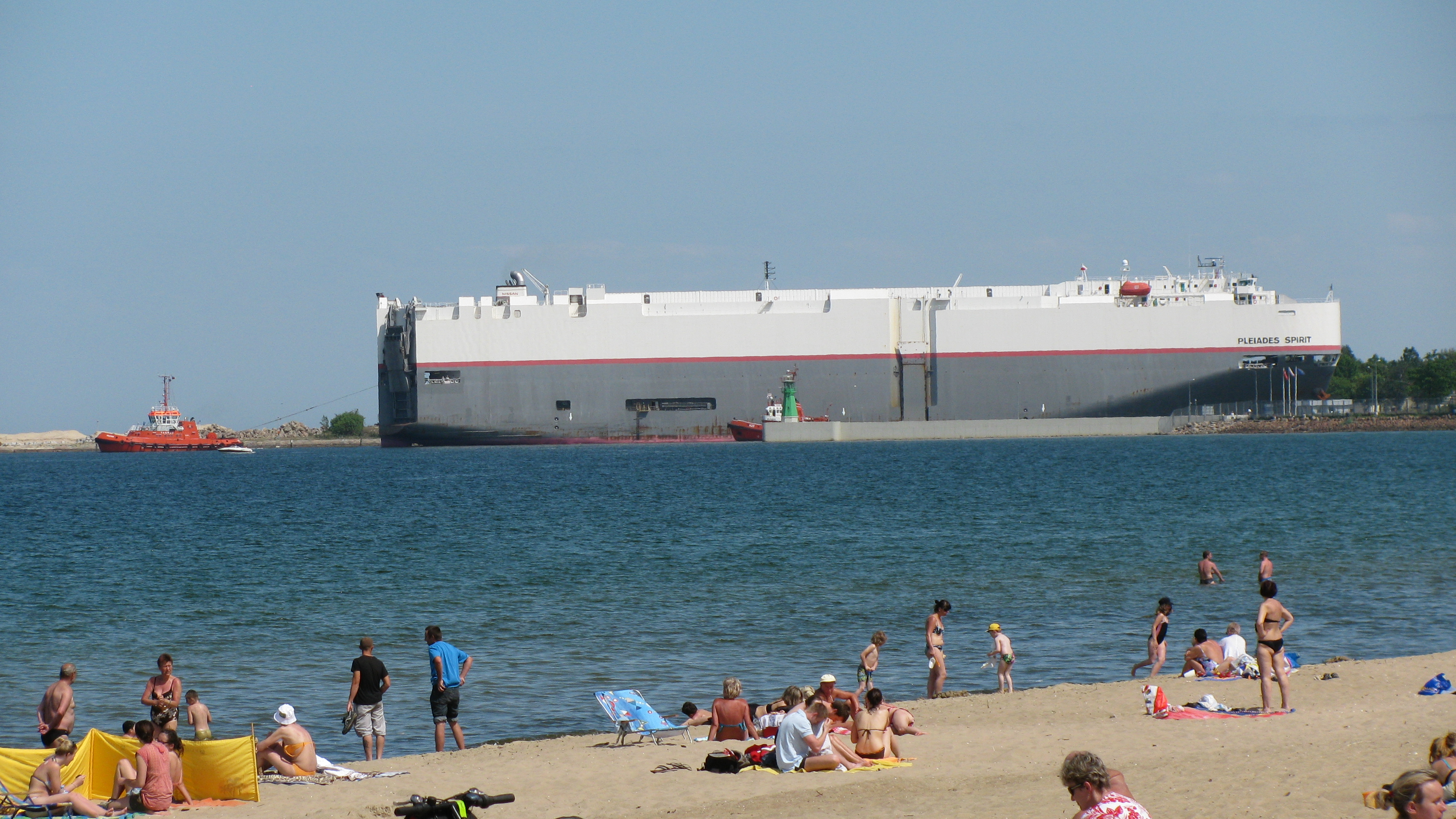
mv Pleiades Spirit

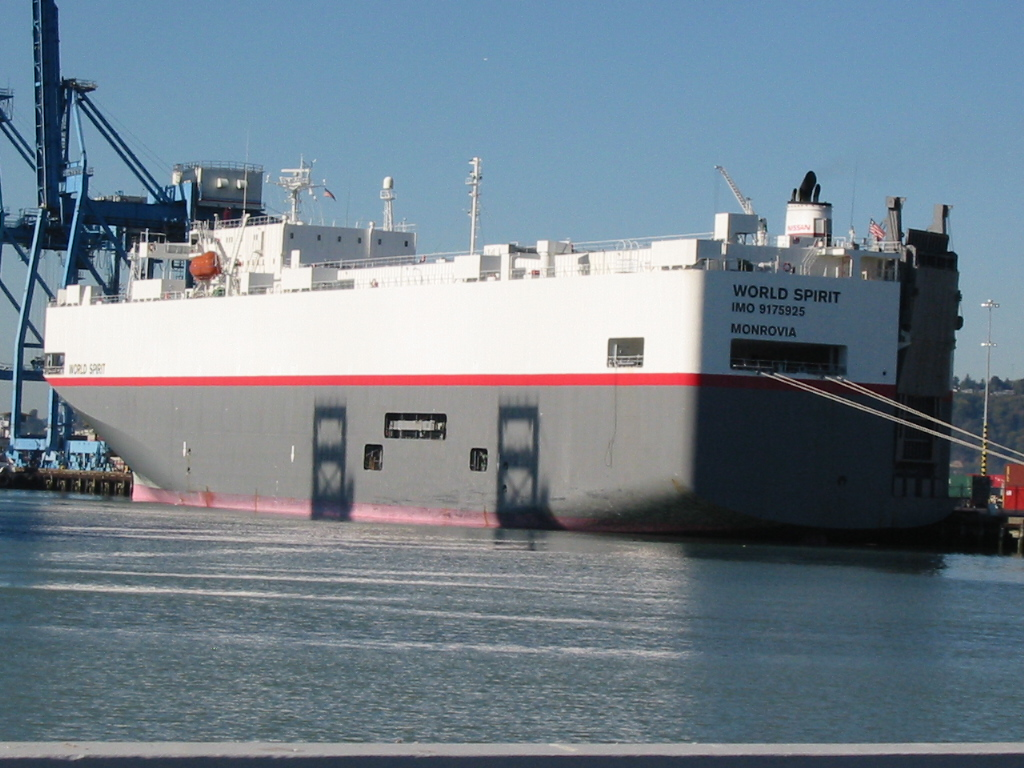
mv World Spirit
