= Siem Offshore =

International offshore shipping company

Siem Offshore Inc.
- Type: Public (OSE: SIOFF)
- Industry: Shipping
- Founded: 2005
- Headquarters: Cayman Islands
- Area served: Global
- Services: Offshore Vessels
- Number of employees: 1,078 (2012)
- Website: www.siemoffshore.com

Siem Offshore is an international offshore and subsea shipping company registered on the Cayman Islands with its main offices in Kristiansand, Norway.

The Company's fleet includes 50 vessels, of which 15 are under construction. The fleet includes platform supply vessels - PSVs, anchor handling tug and supply vessels - AHTS, multipurpose field and ROV support vessels - MRSVs, offshore subsea construction vessels - OSCVs, well intervention vessels - WIVs, scientific core drilling vessels - SCDVs and crew transport vessels - CTVs.

Furthermore, the subsidiary Siem Consub (Siem Offshore do Brasil) operates additional vessels in Brazil.

Siem Industries (33.7%) and Ace Crown International (19.4%) are the largest owners.

== History ==
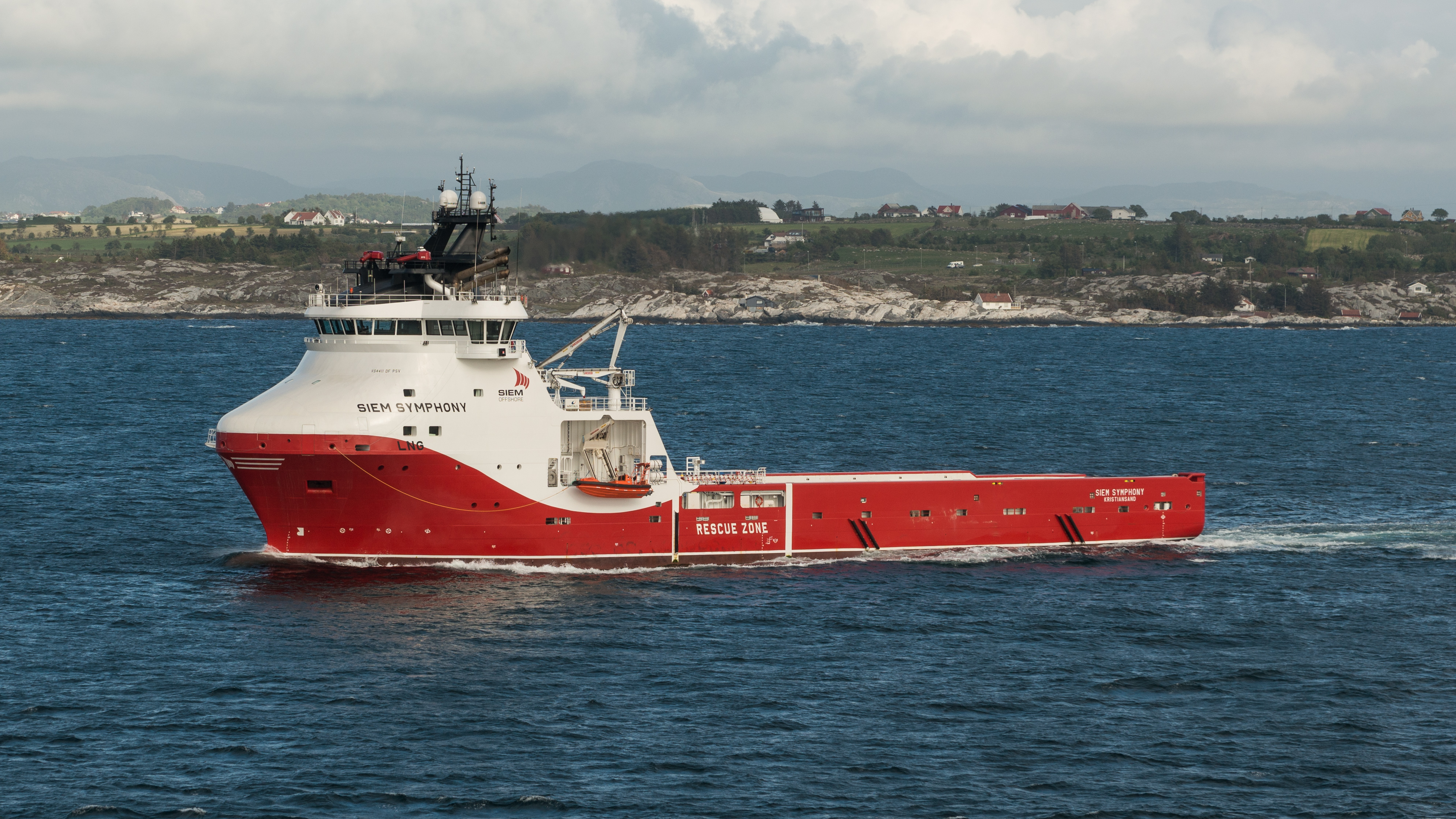
The PSV Siem Symphony near Stavanger, Norway

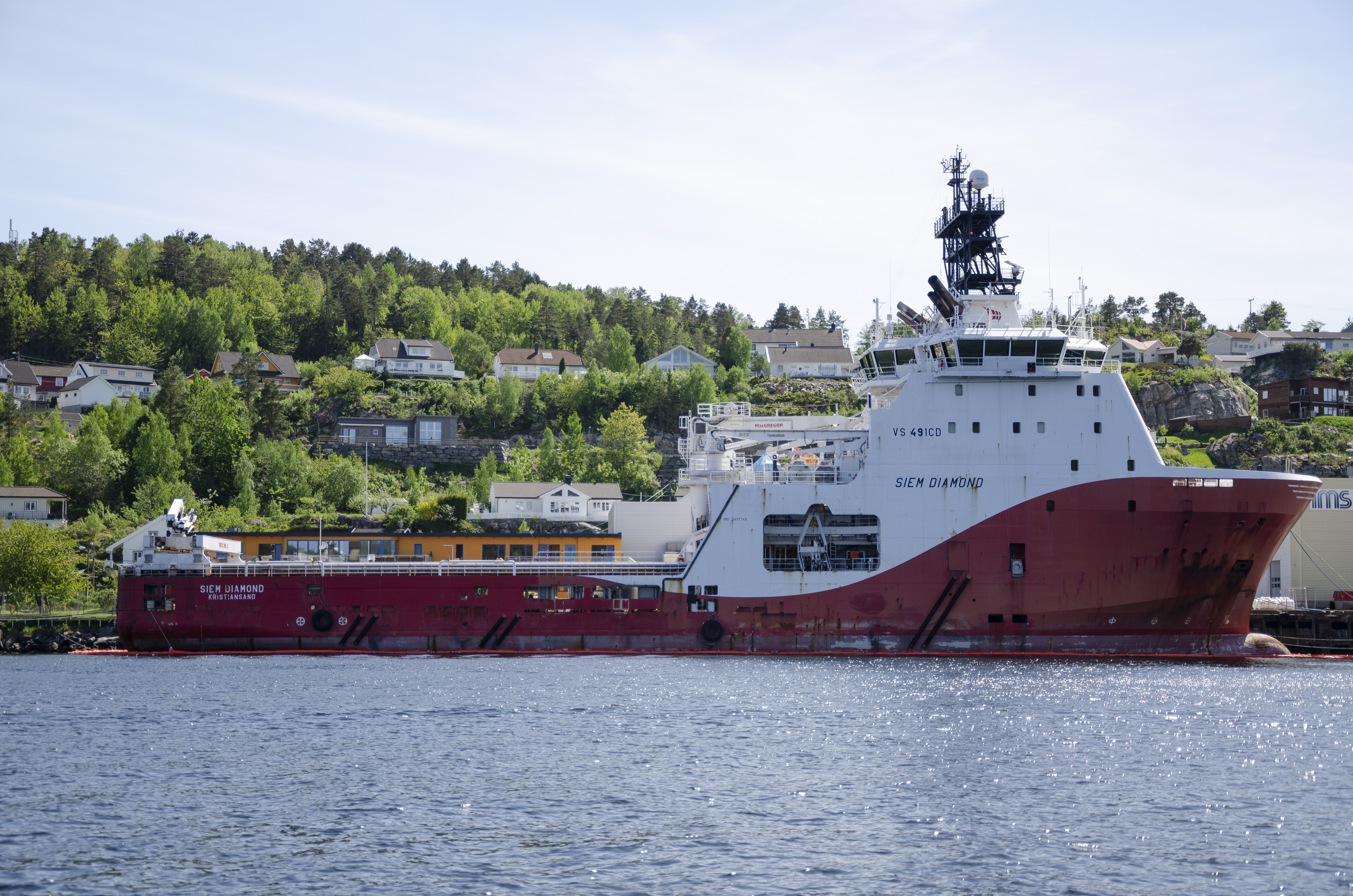
Siem Diamond moored in Risør, Norway.

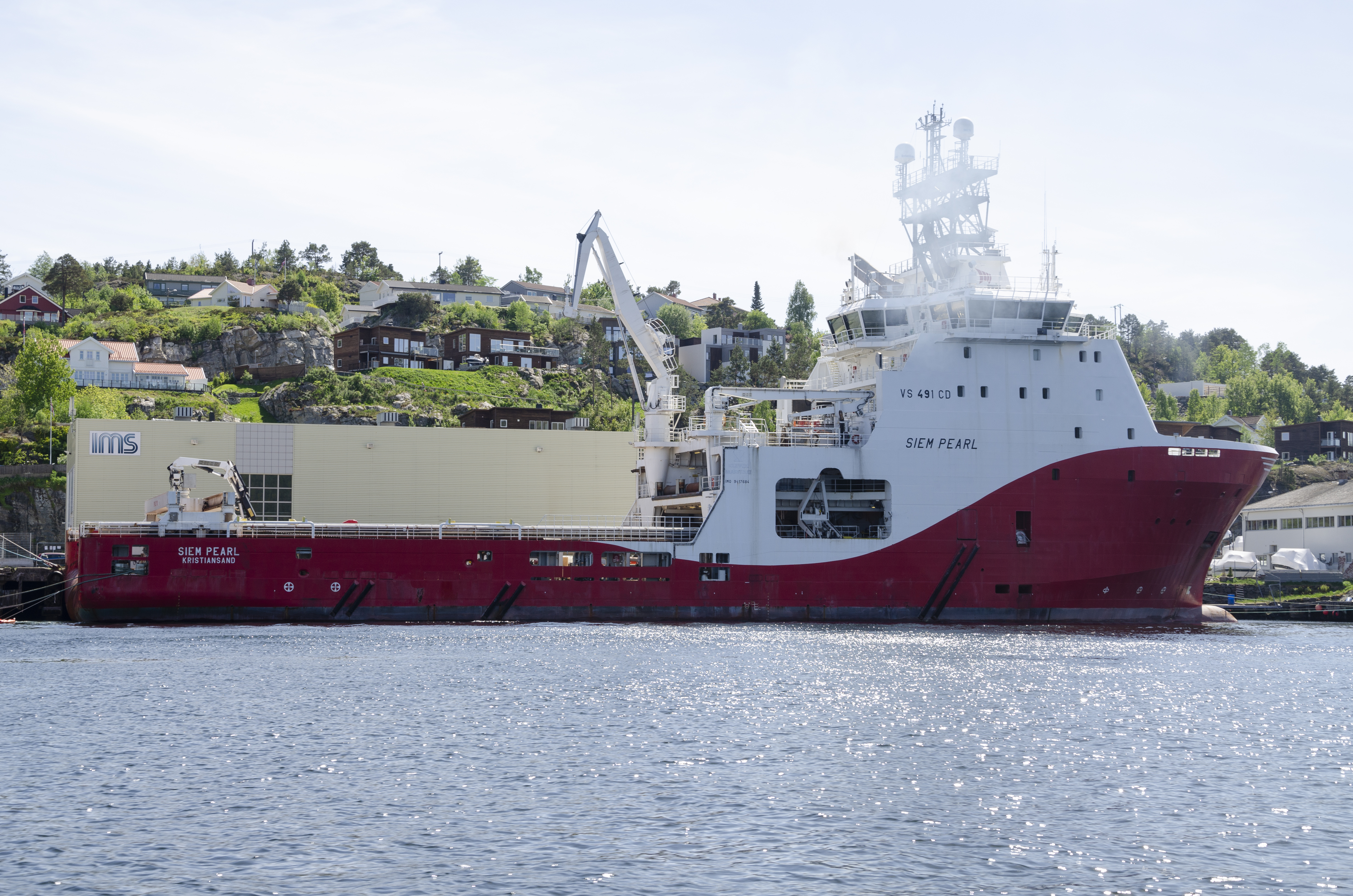
Siem Pearl moored in Risør, Norway.

The company was founded on 1 July 2005 as a spin-off from Subsea 7. In September the same year it bought Rovde Shipping and has since ordered a substantial number of new vessels, primarily platform supply, anchor handling tug and supply as well as offshore subsea construction and well intervention vessels.

In 2011, the company expanded into the contracting business, when Five Oceans Services was acquired and subsequently renamed to Siem Offshore Contractors (SOC). SOC is specialized in the installation, repair and maintenance of submarine cable systems, with a regional focus on the renewable energy sector in Europe and the offshore oil and gas sector in the Middle east.

== See also ==
- Siem Shipping
