= Toyofuji Shipping =

Shipping company

Toyofuji Shipping Co.
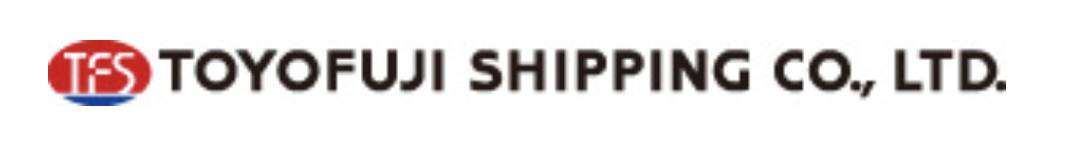

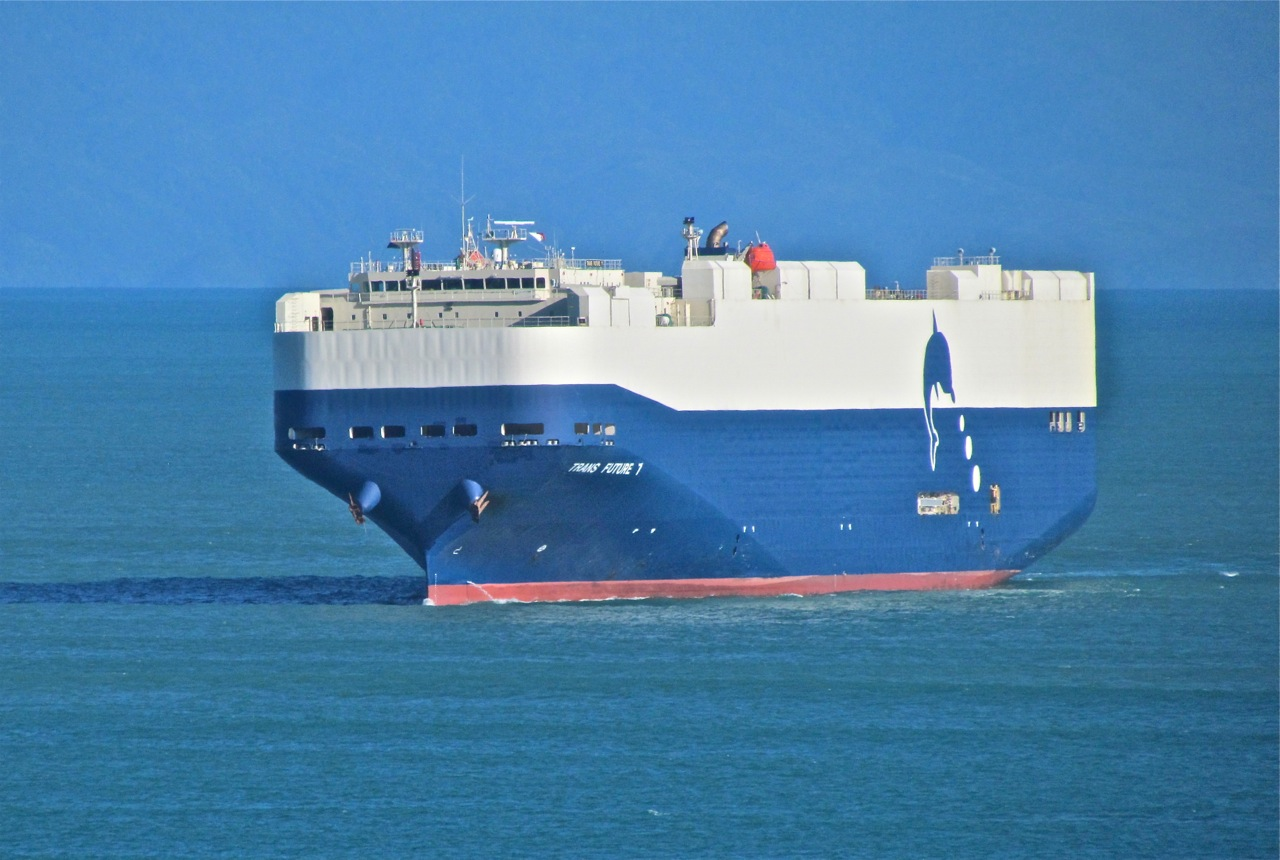
- Industry: Transport
- Founded: 1964
- Headquarters: Nagoya, Japan
- Services: Roll-on/roll-off shipping
- Number of employees: 250
- Website: toyofuji.co.jp

Toyofuji Shipping Co is a roll-on/roll-off shipping company based in Nagoya, Japan and owned by Toyota Group. It has a subsidiary branch in Europe for short sea operations within the region, located in Belgium.

== Overview ==
The company was created in March 1964. It specializes in maritime transport and distribution of cargo such as automobiles, trucks, trailers, Mafi roll trailers, heavy construction machineries and further types of rolling freight.

The main trade lanes covered include domestic transport, from Japan to South East Asia, and from Japan to Australia and New Zealand. These services are performed by a fleet of six smaller ships, and eighteen larger roll-on/roll-off oceanic vessels.

In September 2017, the company announced plans to build and purchase new ships powered by LNG. The first to be delivered in July 2024 by Mitsubishi Heavy Industries shipyard was mv Trans Harmony Green, with a GRT of 49,500, and deck space for 3000 cars.

The company logo is painted on each ship hull, and depicts a blue dolphin shooting three water bubbles.

== See also ==
- Euro Marine Logistics
- EUKOR
- Grimaldi Group
- KESS - K Line Europe Short Sea
- Hyundai Glovis
- Nippon Yusen Kaisha
- Nissan Motor Car Carrier
- Siem Shipping
- United European Car Carriers

== Ships gallery ==
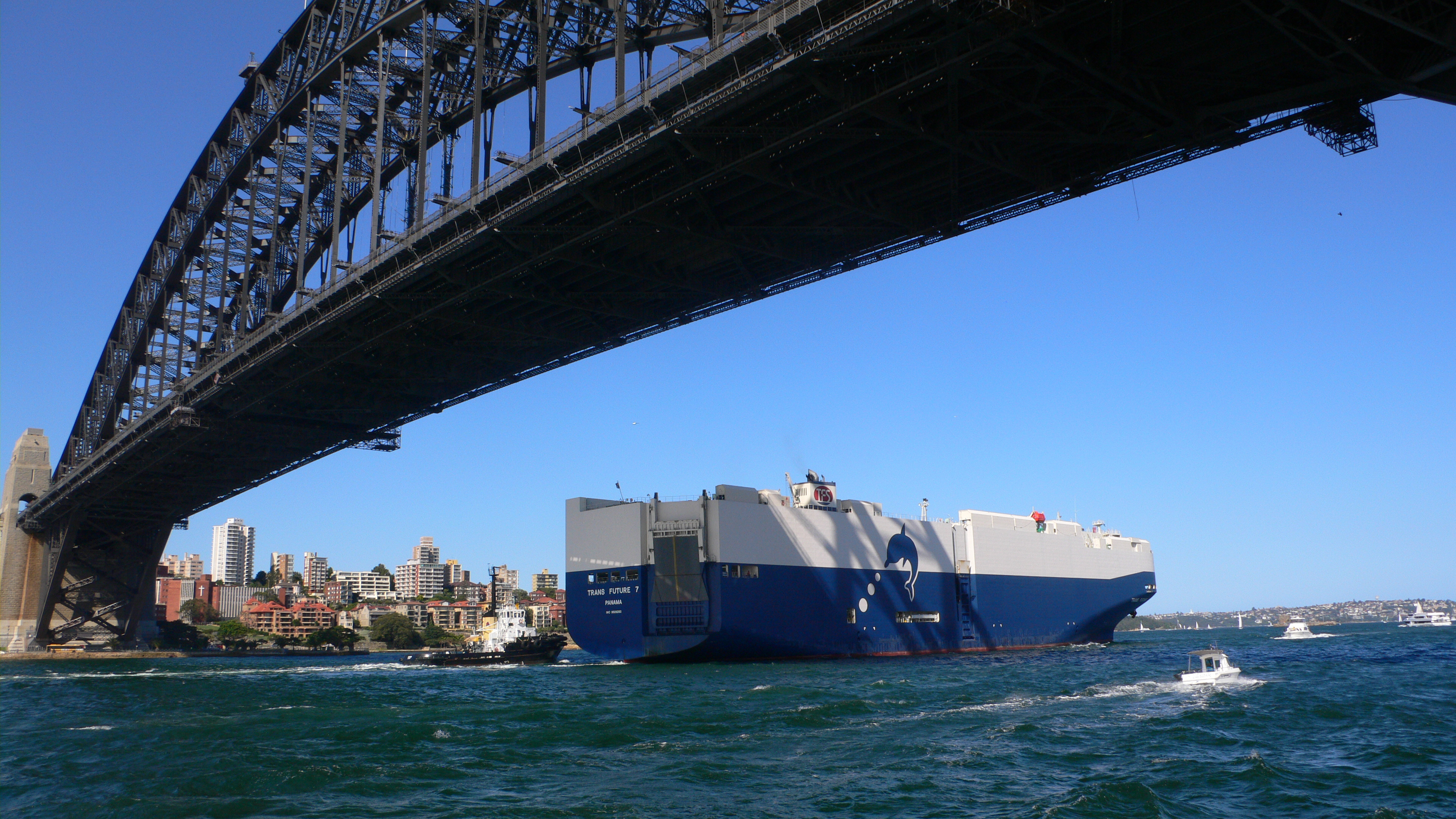
mv Trans Future 7

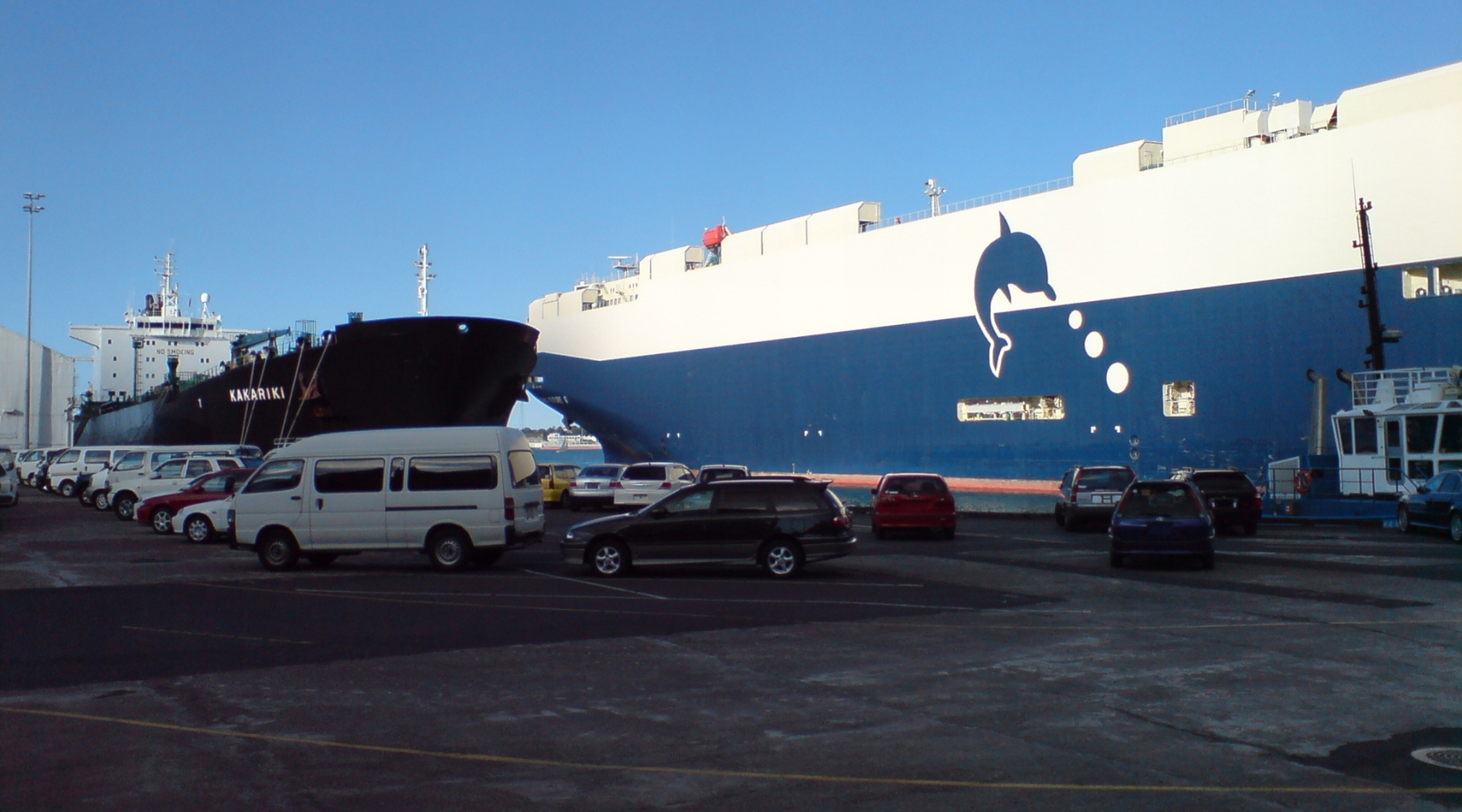
mv Trans Future 6

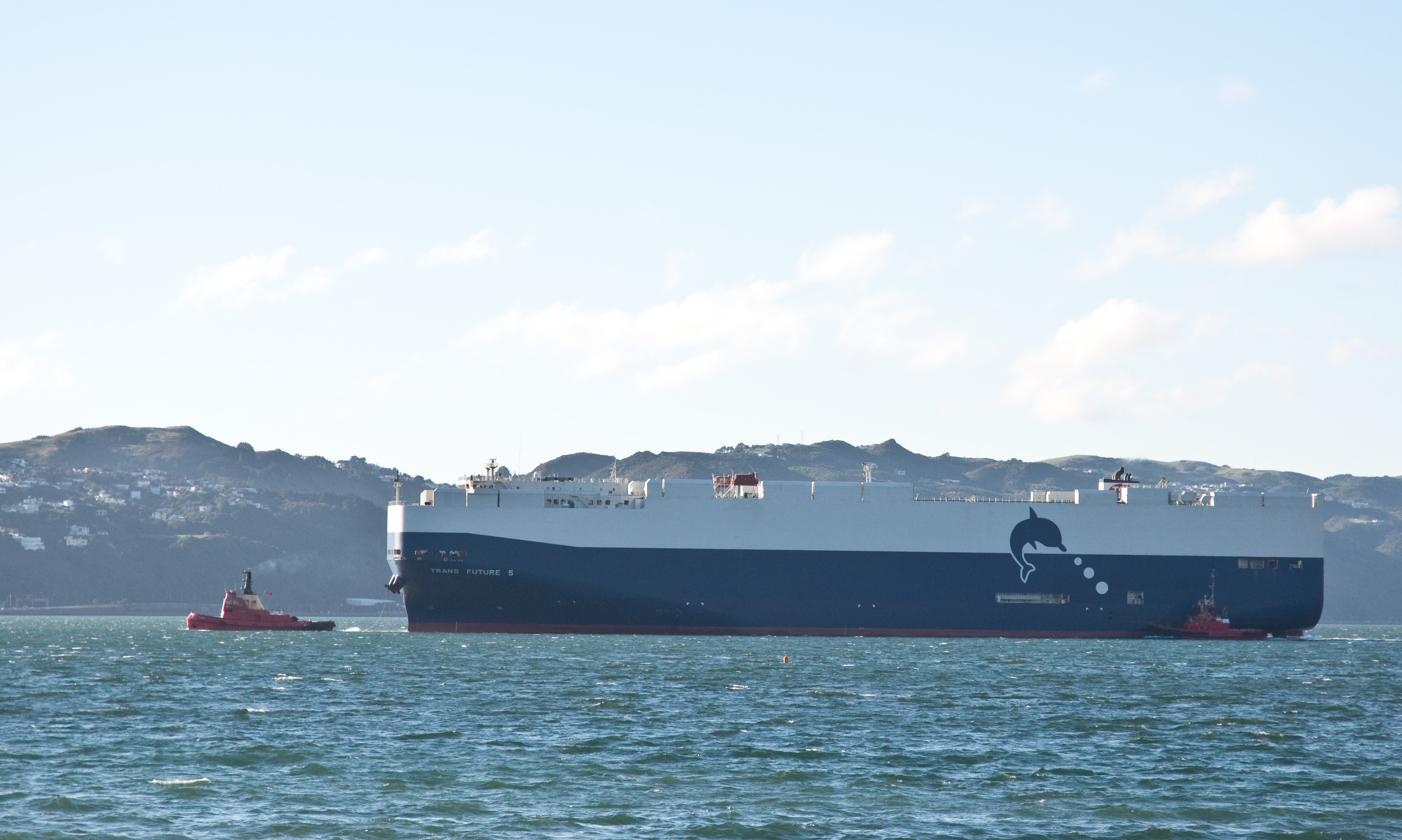
mv Trans Future 5

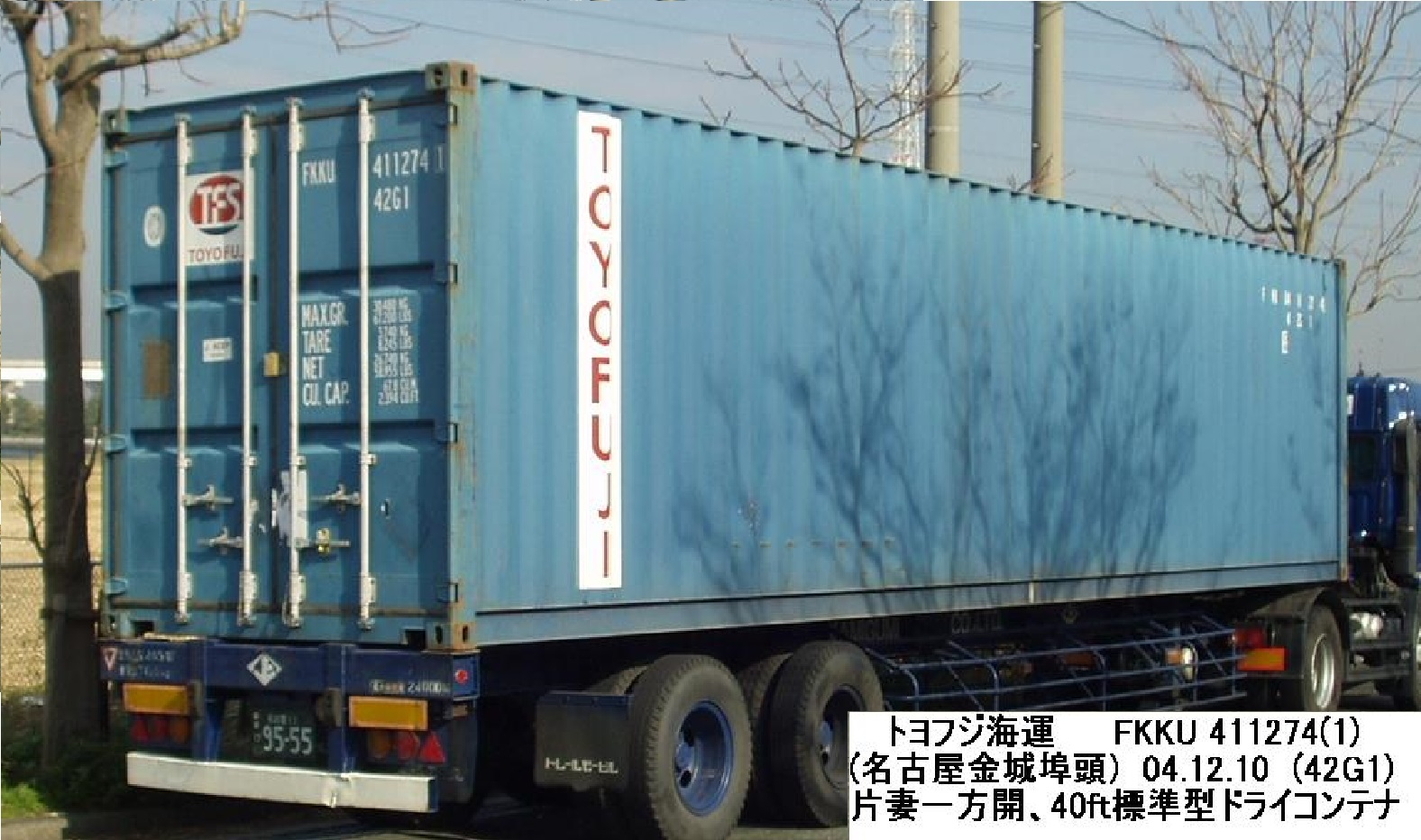
Toyofuji container
