= K Line European Sea Highway Services =

German roll on/roll off shipping line

K Line European Sea Highway Services GmbH

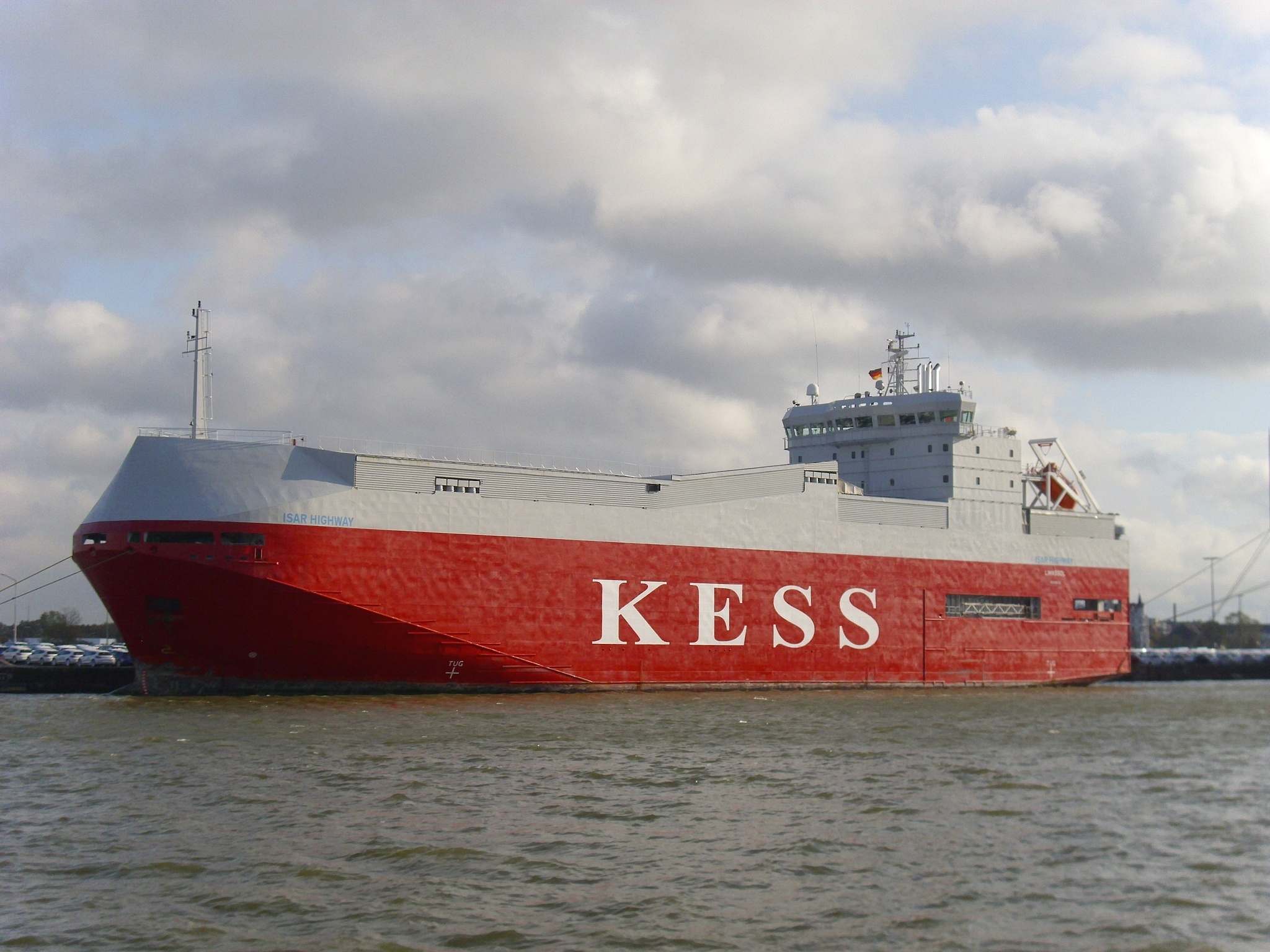
- Industry: Transport Automotive
- Founded: 2003
- Headquarters: Bremen, Germany
- Website: www.kess.kline.de

K Line European Sea Highway Services GmbH (KESS) is a roll-on/roll-off shipping line based in Bremen, Germany and is a subsidiary of the Japanese shipping line K Line.

== Company overview ==
KESS was founded by K Line Tokyo in 2003 and operates with a fleet of 11 car carrier vessels in Western and Northern Europe. KESS specialises in feeder traffic, known as short sea shipping, between the large car terminals in Bremerhaven and Zeebrugge and various smaller car terminals in the North Sea and Baltic Sea area. It transports around 800,000 vehicles per year.

KESS has its roots in a joint venture established in 1991 between KESS parent company "K" Line Tokyo and the former Bremen based automotive logistics company and shipowner Egon H. Harms.

KESS was created by to both offer an intra Europe short sea service to Japanese car makers manufacturing cars in European plants, and to provide feeder carriage to smaller European ports not called at by larger oceanic vessels.

The company in fact specializes in the maritime transport and distribution of cargo such as automobiles, trucks, trailers, Mafi roll trailers, heavy construction machineries and further types of rolling cargo.

The main trade lanes are European, and specifically ports in North Continent Europe, including Germany, Belgium, UK, Ireland, Scandinavia, Baltic region and Russia.

The company operates 11 roll-on/roll-off ships.

== Fleet ==
Vessel	Length	Max. Capacity (Vehicles)	Built
Elbe Highway	148 m	1600	2005
Thames Highway	148 m	1600	2005
Danube Highway	148 m	1600	2006
Seine Highway	148 m	1600	2007
Ems Highway	100 m	850	1999
Isar Highway	100 m	850	2000
Schelde Highway	100 m	750	1993
Weser Highway	100 m	750	1994
Malacca Highway	139 m	1250	2001

(Status: January 2023)

== Facts and accidents ==
KESS ships are distinguished from those of its parent company K Line by having their hull painted in red as opposed to the grey of K Line.

On 21 September 2017, Greenpeace activists attempted to block the discharging of Volkswagen Suv and cars into Sheerness port, disrupting for several hours the operations of mv Elbe Highway.

On 23 July 2018, car carrier vessel Makassar Highway ran aground at full speed in the Tjust archipelago near Loftahammar, Sweden, causing an oil spill.

On 26 January 2026, the MV Thames Highway experienced a fire in the engine room shortly after departing the port of Emden near the island of Borkum. The fire was extinguished by the captain and ship's and captain but the vessel was unable to continue its journey to Grimsby. On 27January 2026, the Dutch tugs Waterstraat and Waterstroom towed her back to the port of Emden.

== Ships gallery ==
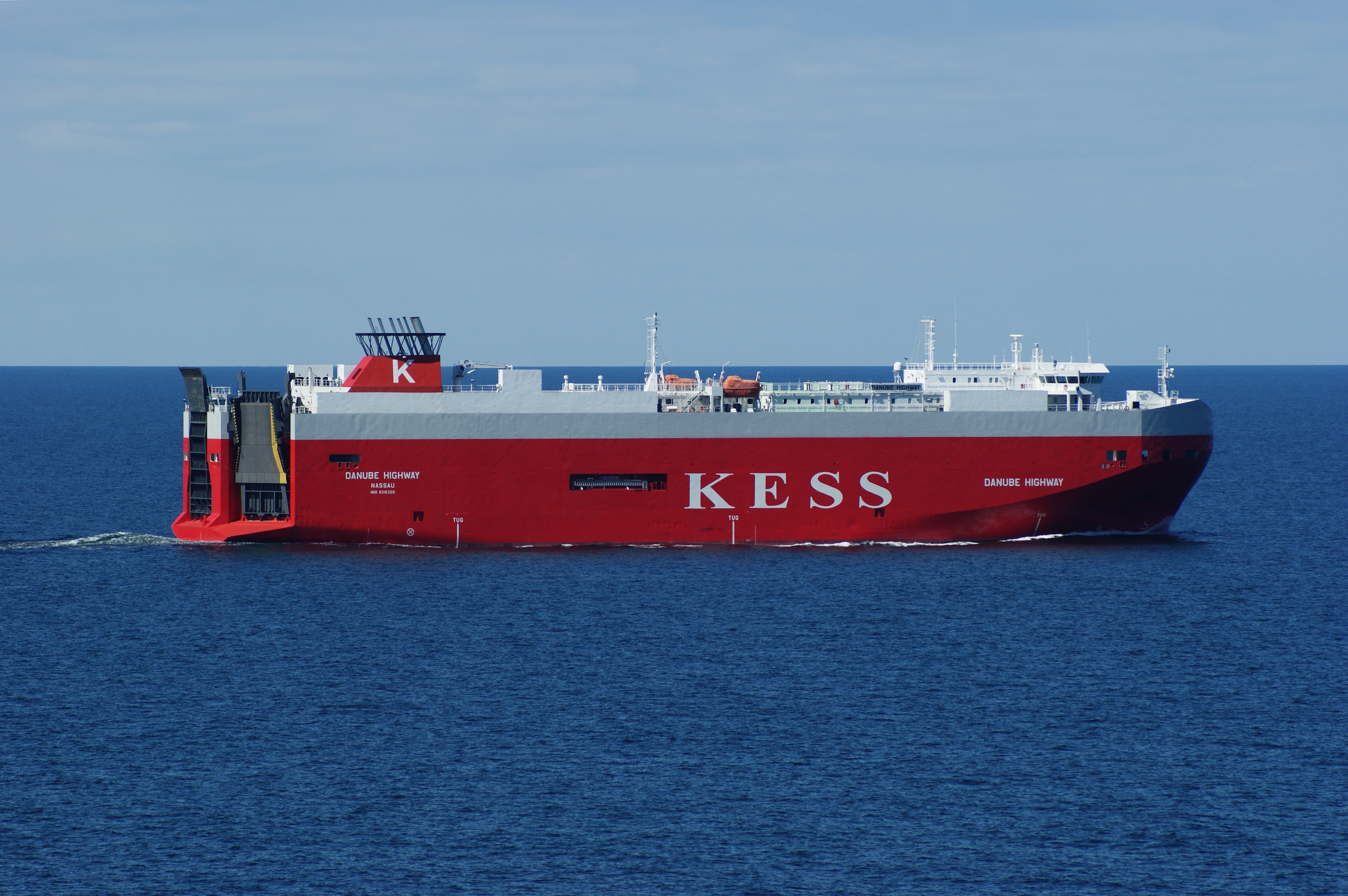
mv Danube Highway

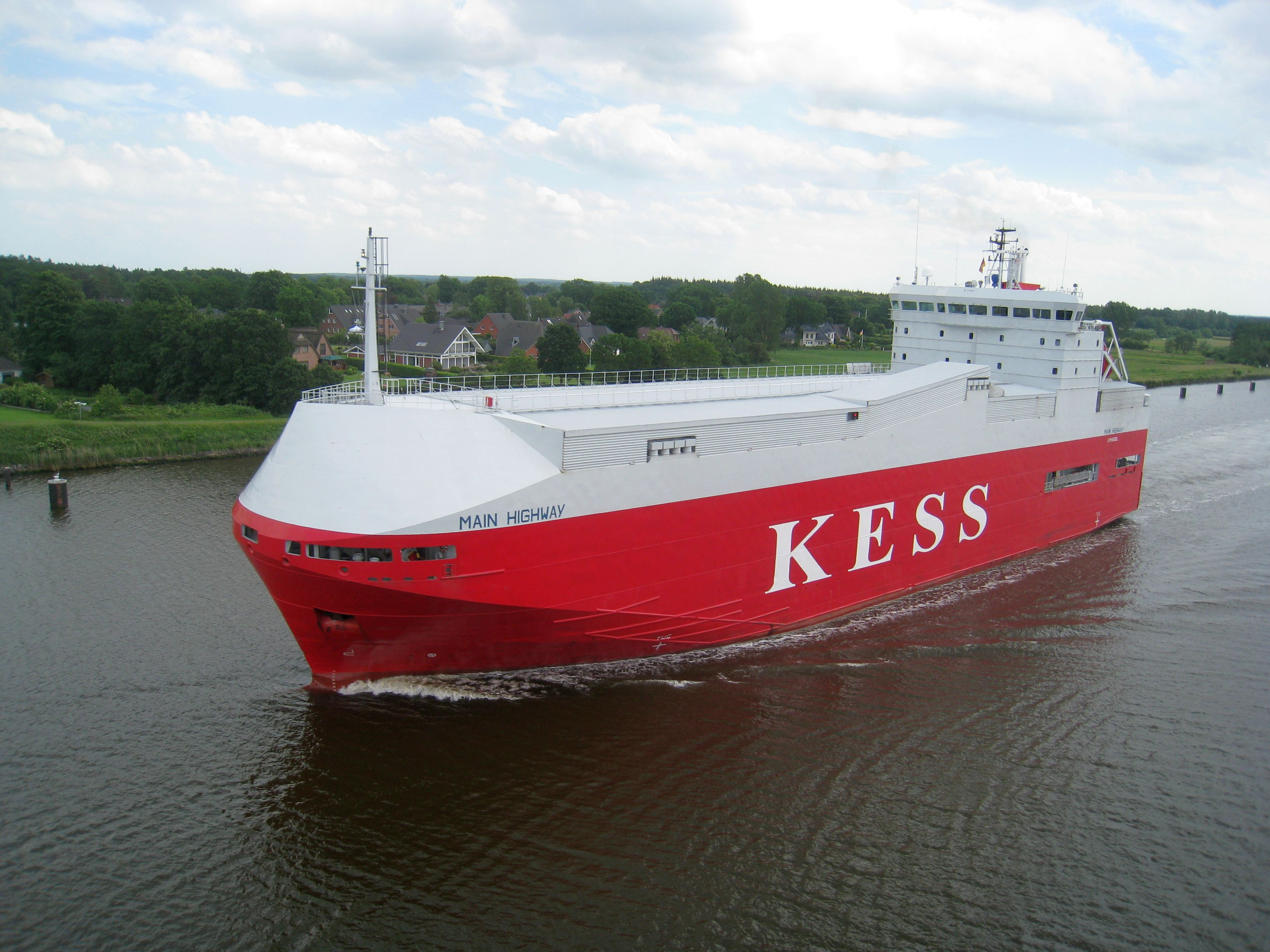
mv Main Highway

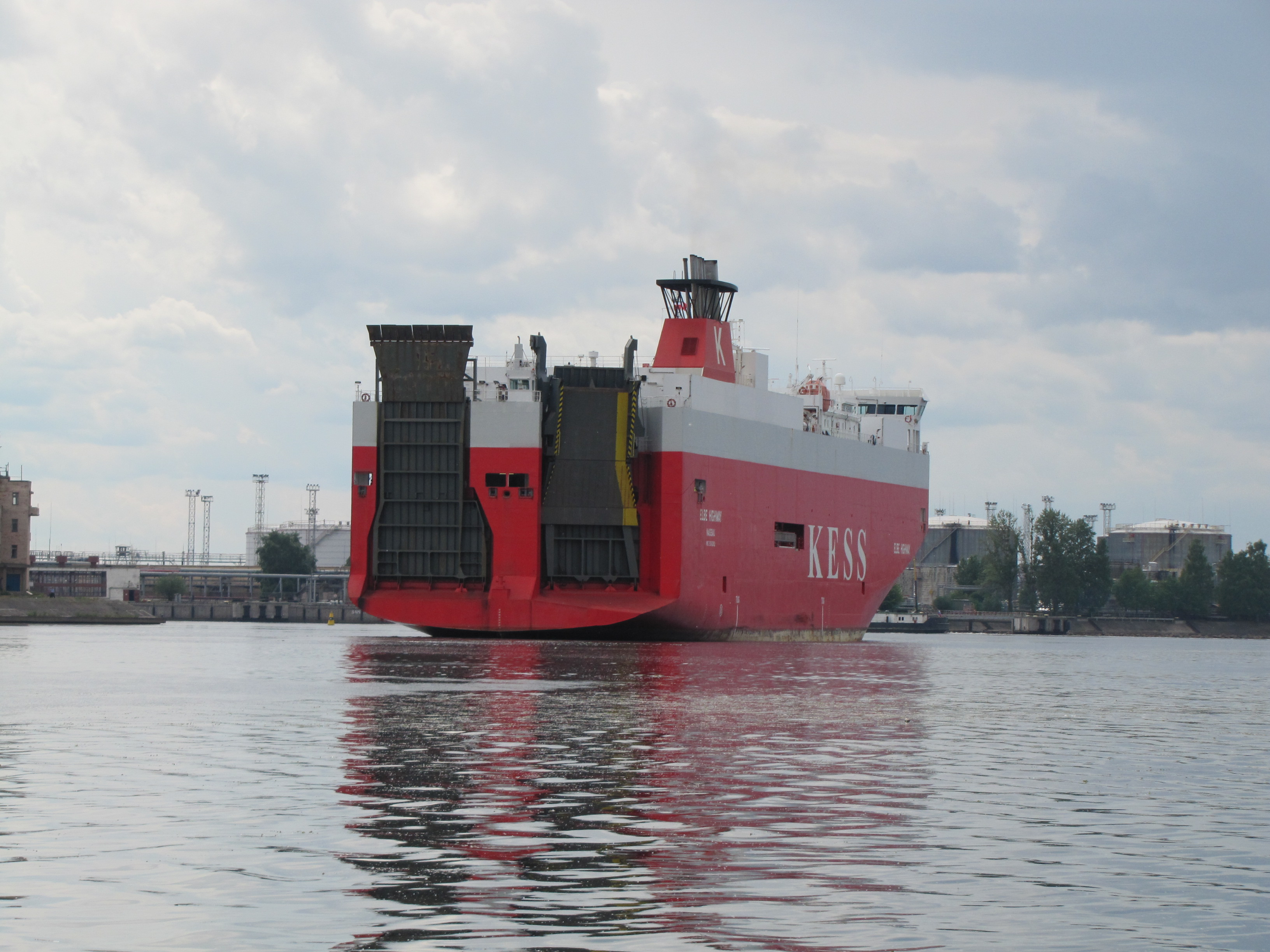
mv Elbe Highway

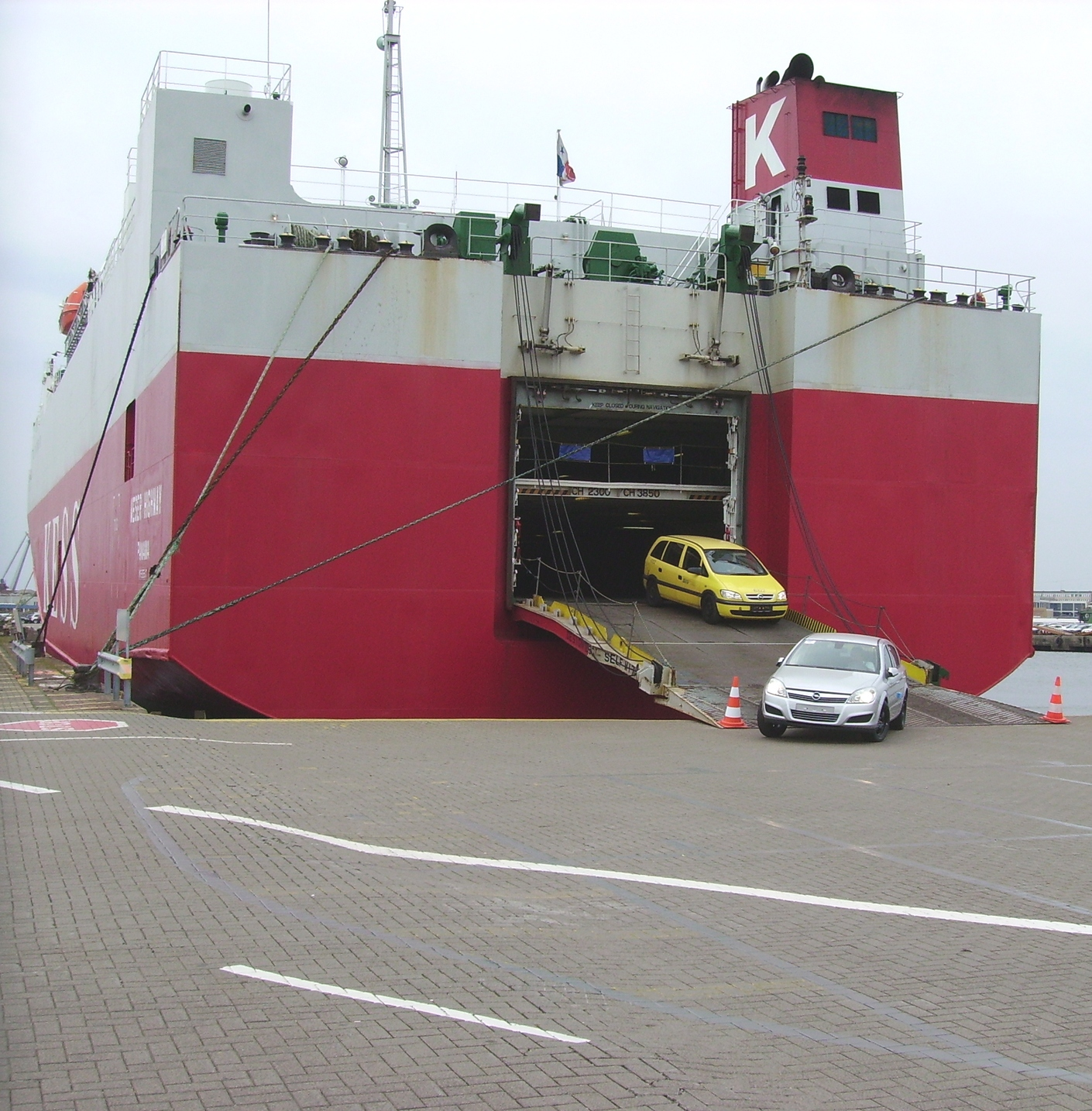
mv Weser Highway

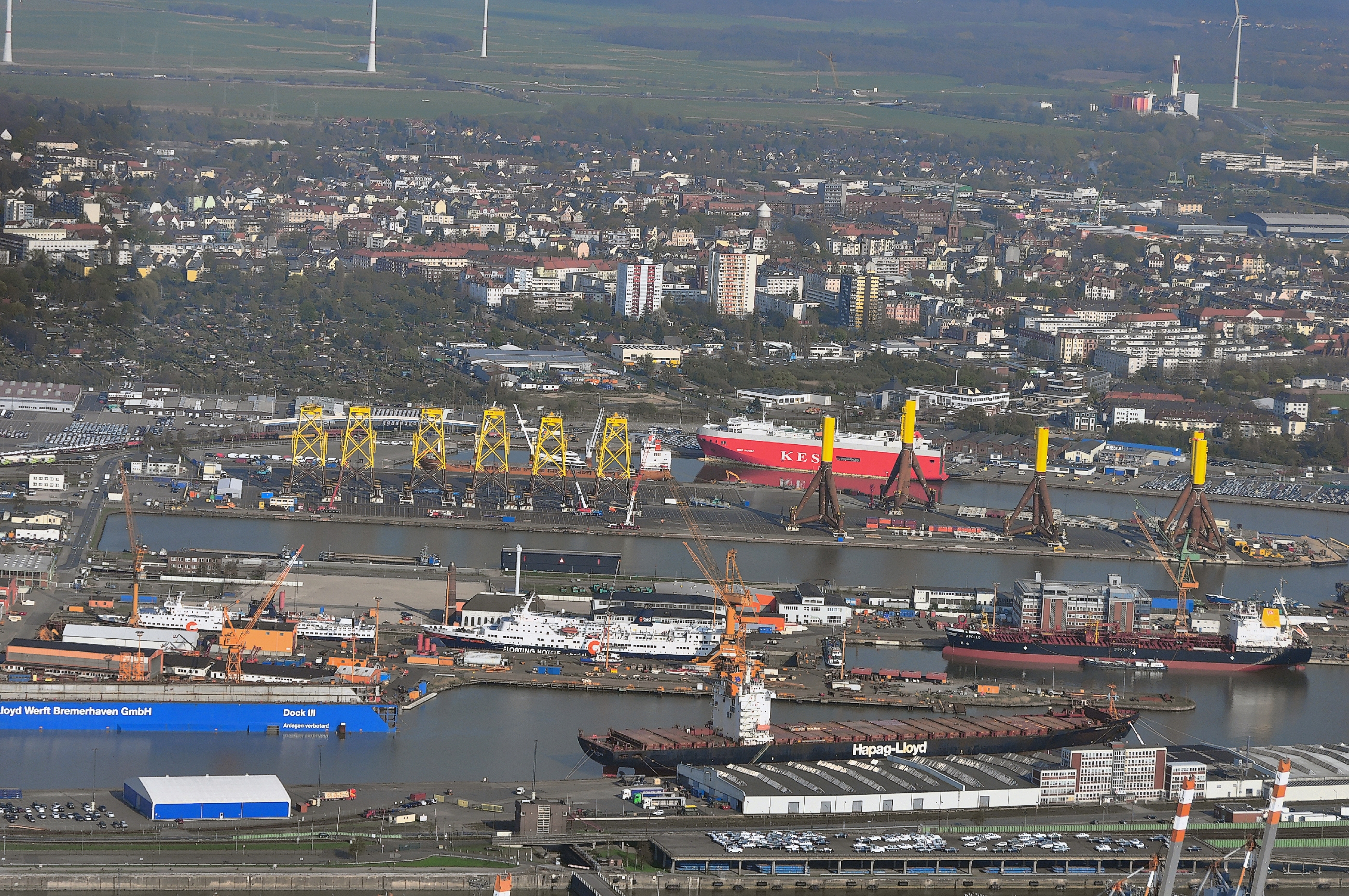
KESS vessel

== See also ==
- K Line
- United European Car Carriers
- Nissan Motor Car Carrier
- Euro Marine Logistics
- Toyofuji Shipping
- Nippon Yusen Kaisha
