= Badshah =

Badshah or Baadshah may refer to:

- Padishah, or Badshah, a superlative sovereign title of Persian origin

== People ==
- Badshah (rapper) (Aditya Prateek Singh, born 1984), Indian rapper
- Badshah Begum (1703–1789), first wife and chief consort of the Mughal emperor Muhammad Shah
- Abdul Ghaffar Khan (1890–1988), Pashtun independence activist also known as Bādshāh Khān
- Akbar Badshah (born 1985), Pakistani first-class cricketer
- Ali Badshah, Canadian actor, writer, producer and director
- Shah Rukh Khan (born 1965), Indian actor, known as the "Badshah of Bollywood"

== Arts and entertainment ==
- Badshah (1954 film), a Bollywood film
- Badshah (1964 film), an Indian Hindi-language film
- Baadshah (1999 film), an Indian Hindi-language action comedy, starring Shah Rukh Khan in the title role
- Badsha the King, a 2004 Indian Bengali-language film
- Badsha – The Don, a 2016 Indian Bengali-language film by Baba Yadav
- Baadshah (2013 film), an Indian Telugu-language action comedy film.
  - Baadshah (soundtrack)
- Basha (film) (lit. 'Badshah'), a 1995 Indian Tamil-language gangster film by Suresh Krissna
- Golden Divas Baatein With Badshah, a 2017 Indian talk show hosted by Shah Rukh Khan (Badshah)
- Baadshah, a fictional character in the 1999 Indian film Jaanwar, portrayed by Akshay Kumar

== See also ==
- Badushah, Indian dessert
- Padishah (disambiguation)
- Basha (disambiguation), alternative transliteration
- Baasha (disambiguation), alternative transliteration
- Pacha (disambiguation), alternative transliteration
- Bacha (disambiguation)
- Badshahi Angti (disambiguation)
