= Bacha =

Bacha may refer to:

- Bacha (surname)
- Bacha (given name)
- Leucocasia gigantea, also known as "bạc hà" in Vietnam, a Southeast Asian vegetable
- Bacha bazi (sometimes known as "bacchá"), a Central Asian tradition of keeping boys as concubines as women and girls are forbidden to perform for men

== See also ==
- Baadshah (disambiguation)
- Pacha (disambiguation)
- Pasha (disambiguation)
- Basha (disambiguation)
