= Wadad =

Tunisia singer (1931 - 2009)

Wedad
- Born: Bahia Faraj Al-Awwad; September 1, 1931; Tunis, French Tunisia
- Died: February 20, 2009 (aged 77) Cairo, Egypt
- Genres: Arabic classical
- Years active: 1959 - 2009
- Spouses: Mohamed Abdo Saleh (divorced) Toufic El Bacha (m. 1972; div. 1973) Abdul Jalil Wahbi (divorced)

Bahia Faraj Al-Awad (Arabic: وداد وهبي), also known as Bahia, Bibi, and, most famously, Wedad (September 1 1931 - February 20 2009) was a Tunisian-Lebanese singer.

== Life ==
Bahia Faraj Al-Awad was born in Tunis in 1931. Her mother was the Alexandrian singer Saliha Al-Masryia, while her father was the Halabi artist Faraj Awad, an oud player from the Jews of Aleppo, and head of the musical band of Munira Al-Mahdiyya. Her sisters were Saliha Al-Masryia and Amal, who became a famous singer under the name Nargis Shawqi after her marriage to the Lebanese Jewish composer Salim Basal (Salim Shawqi). Amal and Salim left for Israel in the 1970s after new suspicions arose about their connection to Israeli intelligence.

When she traveled with her parents to Cairo, she received an offer to shoot Egyptian films. Her father opposed the matter, and she ran away with Mohamed Abdo Saleh, the qanun player in Umm Kulthum's band, who promised to make her an artistic star. His true intentions appeared after the marriage, and her parents managed to get her back from him with the help of Umm Kulthum.

She married the Lebanese poet Abdul Jalil Wahbi and benefited from him and communicated with the artistic community in Lebanon.

Her third marriage was to the Lebanese musician Toufic El Bacha in 1955. She gave birth to three children during the marriage: the pianist Abdel Rahman El Bacha, Randa, and Rima, who is considered one of the prominent names in composing and distributing music in Lebanon and the Arab world. He composed several songs for her that were an incentive for her on the path to fame, as he composed the light song for her and songs of an authentic oriental character and muwashshahat.

== Career ==
- Mohamed Abdel Muttalib invited her to record his first old songs in her voice.
- Show Baligh Hamdi's first works were given to her to choose from, which she composed from her Parisian home for great male and female artists.
- Her stage name was chosen by fellow singer Fairuz
- She moved between Arab capitals since her childhood to achieve her dream of singing, she sang for great Iraqi composers.
- Her songs were broadcast daily on Arab radio stations and she sang with the great Wadih El Safi in many concerts between Beirut and Aleppo.

== Songs ==
- Her repertoire includes more than six thousand songs that were not archived and most of them were forgotten.
- Among the first songs she recorded with her voice on Lebanese radio were the songs “Fi Ghafwat Al Ahlam” and “Mar Al Hawa Qarbi” composed by Muhammad Abdul Karim. After that, she sang “Ya Sakin Qalbi” and “Ya Habeebat Al Kul” composed by Afif Radwan, and “Alf "Warda wa Warda" and "Lawla al-Kalam" and Mahmoud al-Rashidi "Ya Layali al-Hana Ta'ali", Zaki Nassif composed for her "Fi Warda Bain al-Wardat" and Philomon Wahbi "Najmat al-Layl Jabtlu" and Tawfiq Pasha "Lafta Athar" and "Li Habib" and Pasha sang some old muwashshahat such as "Lama Bada Yatathanna" in addition to special muwashshahat composed by him, and with her voice he also sang some of Sayed Darwish's songs including "Basara Barajah", and from the compositions of Sami al-Sidawi she sang "Ya Na'em" and "Yeslam Li al-Fahm" and "Sabahtu wa Ma Rad" and "La Qalbi wa La Ba'refak" and Halim al-Rumi also presented several compositions for her.

== Death ==
Wedad died on February 20 2009, at the age of 78 after suffering from kidney disease, as she used to go to dialysis centers daily.
