= Pasha (disambiguation) =

Pasha was an Ottoman higher rank, and an honorary title.

Pasha or Paşa may also refer to:

== Places ==
- Pasha, Queensland, a locality in the Isaac Region of Australia
- Pasha (river), in Leningrad Oblast, Russia
- "Pasha enclaves", another name for the India–Bangladesh enclaves

== Science ==
- Pasha, a name for the Herona marathus species of butterfly
- Pasha butterflies, a name for some of the Charaxes genus of butterflies
- Pasha (protein), an alias for the DGCR8 protein, used especially when it appears in non-human animals such as D. melanogaster and C. elegans

== Other uses ==
- Pasha, a diminutive of Pavel, itself a Russian and Czech form of Paul.
- Pasha (film), a 1968 French film directed by Georges Lautner
- Pasha (Hinduism), a supernatural weapon depicted in Hindu iconography
- Pasha (surname), a list of individuals with the surname
- Abdur Rehman Hashim Syed, also known as Pasha, retired Pakistan Army major and Lashkar-e-Taiba member
- Pasha Group, an American shipping company
  - Pasha Hawaii, a company in the Pasha Group that specializes in trade between Hawaii and the continental United States
- PASHA Holding, an Azerbaijani financial corporation
- Pasha Records, an American record label
- Pakistan Software Houses Association for IT and ITeS (P@SHA), a Pakistani IT trade body that promotes and develops the software and services industry
- Pasha, a GWR Iron Duke Class steam locomotive
- Pasha, a virtual pinball table that first appeared in the video game Pinball FX 2
- Pasha, a fictional villain in the 1988 Indian film Paap Ki Duniya, played by Danny Denzongpa
- Purple Pasha, a fictional female character in Wee Sing in Sillyville

== See also ==
- Pascha (disambiguation)
- Basha (disambiguation), alternative transliteration of the Turkish title
- Pacha (disambiguation), alternative transliteration of the Turkish title
- Bacha (disambiguation)
- Pasha Bulker, a Panamax bulk carrier ship
- Paskha, a Slavic festive dish made in Eastern Orthodox countries that consists of food that is forbidden during the fast of Great Lent
