= Bacha (surname) =

- Abdel Rahman El Bacha (born 1958), Lebanese pianist and composer
- Abderrahmane Bacha (born 1999), Algerian professional footballer
- Ahmed Bin Saleh Bel Bacha (born 1969), one of the Algerian detainees at Guantanamo Bay
- Aymen Bacha (born 1999), Tunisian weightlifter
- Bhinod Bacha (1943–2023), former senior civil servant of Mauritius and political figure
- Bobbi Bacha, American private investigator
- Edmar Bacha (born 1942), Brazilian economist
- Habib Bacha (1931–1999), Melkite Archbishop of the Melkite Greek Catholic Archeparchy of Beirut and Byblos
- Haroon Bacha (born 1972), Pashtun singer and composer
- Ilan Bacha (born 2005), French professional footballer
- Julia Bacha, Brazilian documentary filmmaker
- Mohamed Bacha (born 1967), Algerian football manager
- Mourad Mahour Bacha (born 1961), Algerian former track and field athlete
- Pacha Khan Zadran, Afghan militia and political leader
- Rafik Bacha (born 1989), Tunisian handball player
- Selma Bacha (born 2000), French women's footballer
- Sher Ali Bacha, Pashtun nationalist politician
- Syed Muhammad Ali Shah Bacha, Pakistani politician
- Toufic El Bacha (1924–2005), Lebanese composer
- Zelalem Bacha (born 1988), Bahraini long-distance runner
