= 2023 Palanca Awards =

Writing award

71st Palanca Awards
- Date: November 27, 2023
- Location: Philippine International Convention Center, Pasa, Philippines

The 71st Don Carlos Palanca Memorial Awards for Literature was held on November 27, 2023, at the Philippine International Convention Center in Pasay to commemorate the memory of Carlos Palanca through an endeavor that would promote education and culture in the country.

A total of 54 writers, 30 of whom were first-time awardees, were chosen as this year's recipients. The total number of writing categories awarded was 20. Luis P. Gatmaitan, recipient of the Palanca Awards Hall of Fame in 2005, was Guest of Honor and Speaker at this year's awarding ceremony.

The 2023 winners are divided into four categories:

== English Division ==
=== Short Story ===
- First Prize: Exie Abola, "Vile Creatures"
- Second Prize: Ian Rosales Casocot, "Don't Follow Me, I Don't Even Know Where I'm Going"
- Third Prize: Katrina Torralba, "Amadito and Amanda"

=== Short Story for Children ===
- First Prize: No Winner
- Second Prize: Jonny Bernal Pornel, "The Legend of Ipot-Ipot"
- Third Prize: Elvie Victonette Razon-Gonzalez, "The Race to Uswag"

=== Essay ===
- First Prize: Rio Renato Pulido Constantino, "The Year of the Periwinkle"
- Second Prize: Russell Stanley Geronimo, "Profile of a Stateless Person: Notes on a Deportation Proceeding"
- Third Prize: Francine Marquez, "Normalizing Survival"

=== Poetry ===
- First Prize: Patricia Mariya Shishikura, "Translating Wildfires"
- Second Prize: Vince Raphael Agcaoili, "Carrying"
- Third Prize: Michael Maniquiz, "Lou Reed Meets Delmore Schwartz at a Bar"

=== Poetry Written for Children ===
- First Prize: John Patrick Solano, "Odd Numbers"
- Second Prize: Ian Rosales Casocot, "Bisaya for All That We Gugma"
- Third Prize: Simone Marie Sales, "Paper Planes"

=== One-Act Play ===
- First Prize: Randy Q. Villanueva, "Neneng"
- Second Prize: Ian Rosales Casocot, "The Midsummer of Manuel Arguilla"
- Third Prize: Rossielle Sarabia Manicad, "My Lover's Presscon"

=== Full-Length play ===
- First Prize: Miguel Antonio Alfredo Luarco, "Dogsblood"
- Second Prize: No Winner
- Third Prize: No Winner

== Filipino Division ==
=== Maikling Kwento ===
- First Prize: Peter Solis Nery, "Ang Tariktik"
- Second Prize: Jay Jomar Quintos, "Buwaya"
- Third Prize: Ella Jane Hermonio, "Boses Pusa"

=== Maikling Kwentong Pambata ===
- First Prize: Jaylord Losabia, "Si Toyo at si Suka"
- Second Prize: Mikka Ann Cabangon, "Si Liya at ang Dapithapon sa Ilaya"
- Third Prize: Iza Maria Reyes, "Babasagin, Babasagin"

=== Sanaysay ===
- First Prize: Kimberly Rose Pillo, "Kung Paanong Nagmukha Akong Sponge sa Harap ng mga Pinggan"
- Second Prize: Al Joseph Lumen, "Auslander: Mga Danas sa Alemanya"
- Third Prize: Edward Joseph Fernandez, "Ako ay si Ako Nga"

=== Tula ===
- First Prize: Mikael de Lara Co, "Epistolaryo ng Bagamundo at ang Tugon ng Multo"
- Second Prize: Rogelio dela Rosa Jr., "Ang Hindi Maiwasang Patlang"
- Third Prize: Ralph Lorenz Fonte, "Ex Novo Mvndo"

=== Tulang Pambata ===
- First Prize: Dexter Gragasin, "Tutula, Tutuli, Tutulo"
- Second Prize: Genaro Gojo Cruz, "Ako, Mga Tulang Pambata"
- Third Prize: Keisiah Dawn Tiaoson, "Tugma ng Buhay Kong Payak"

=== Dulang May Isang Yugto ===
- First Prize: Eljay Castro Deldoc, "Ang Lipnayan ng Ating Mga Katawan"
- Second Prize: Dan Ian Paulo Mariposque, "The Divine Family"
- Third Prize: Dustin Edward Celestino, "Fermata"

=== Dulang Ganap ang Haba ===
- First Prize: Miguel Antonio Alfredo Luarca, "Nekropolis"
- Second Prize: Christian Vallez, "Pingkian"
- Third Prize: Joshua Lim So, "Atin ang Panahon"

=== Dulang Pampelikula ===
- First Prize: Jonathan Jurilla, "Love Child"
- Second Prize: Jimmy F. Flores and Emmanuel Q. Palo, "Elehiya"
- Third Prize: Raymund T. Barcelon, "Beki Naman"

== Regional Division ==
=== Short Story [Cebuano] ===
- First Prize: Neile Genica Sy, "Lenteng Pilokilay"
- Second Prize: John Dante, "Ang Magsusulat nga Haduol na sa Kamatayon"
- Third prize: CD Borden, "Alindasay"

=== Short Story [Hiligaynon] ===
- First Prize: Ritchie D. Pagunsan, "Kauhaw sa Tingadlaw"
- Second Prize: Alvin Larida, "Lola Violeta"
- Third Prize: Serafin I. Plotria Jr., "Puno Sang Aligotgot"

=== Short Story [Iluko] ===
- First Prize: Rodolfo D. Agatep Jr., "Diro Ti Disierto"
- Second Prize: Jorge Richard Guerrero, "Idiay Langit, Awan Lanit"
- Third Prize: Clarito de Francia, "Piglatan"

== Kabataan Division ==
=== Kabataan Essay ===
- First Prize: Francis Roberto San Antonio Sevillena, "Living on Play in a World on Pause"
- Second Prize: Glorious Zahara Exylin Alesna, "The Bully is You"
- Third Prize: Rheyn Khrieztine Dela Peña, "Five More Minutes, Please"

=== Kabataan Sanaysay ===
- First Prize: No Winner
- Second Prize: Amancio Caponpon V, "Aranya sa Kisame"
- Third Prize: Glorious Zavannah Exylin Alesna, "Sa Panahon ng Bagabag at Balisa: Paghagilap sa Pira-Pirasong Retaso ng Hinahon at Pa(g)hinga"
