= CYSA =

Cysa may refer to:

- Stratford Municipal Airport, (ICAO: CYSA)
- Cysa (Κύσα), a small village on the coast of Gedrosia where Nearchus fleet arrived.
