= Bashar =

Bashar (Arabic: بشار) is a given name, surname, and place name. Bashar may refer to:

== Places ==
- Bashar, Iran, a village in Qazvin Province, Iran
- Bashar, Plateau State, a village in the Wase local Government Area of Plateau State In Nigeria
- Béchar, the capital city of Béchar Province, Algeria

== People ==
=== Given name ===
- Bashar Abdullah (born 1977), Kuwaiti footballer
- Bashar al-Assad (born 1965), Former president of Syria
- Bashar Jaafari (born 1956), Syrian diplomat
- Bashar Barakah Jackson (1999–2020), American rapper
- Bashar Lulua (born 1963), Berlin-based Arab orchestra conductor
- Bashar Masri (born 1961), Palestinian American entrepreneur
- Bashar Murad (born 1993), Palestinian singer-songwriter
- Bashar Rahal (born 1974), Bulgarian actor of Lebanese descent
- Bashar Rasan (born 1996), Iraqi footballer
- Bashar al-Shatti (born 1982), also known as Basharno, Beesho and Maystro, Kuwaiti singer, songwriter and actor
- Bashar Shbib (born 1959), Syrian Canadian filmmaker
- Bashar Srour (born 1972), Syrian footballer
- Bashar al-Zoubi, Free Syrian Army general
- Bashar Warda (born 1969), Iraqi Chaldean Catholic cleric and Archbishop

=== Surname ===
- Caresse Bashar (born 1976), Syrian film and TV actress
- Habibul Bashar (born 1972), Bangladeshi cricketer
- Khademul Bashar (1935–1976), Bangladeshi air marshal

=== Title ===
- Abul Bashar (born 1951), Bangladeshi writer
- Bashshar ibn Burd (714–783) nicknamed "al-Mura'ath", poet in the late Umayyad and the early Abbasid periods
- Haji Bashar, convicted former Afghan drug lord

== Others ==
- Bashar language, an alternative name for Yankam language, a moribund Plateau language of Nigeria
- Bashar (Dune), a fictional military rank in the Dune universe
- Ya Bashar, studio album by Lebanese recording artist Diana Haddad

== See also ==
- Başar, a Turkish male given name and surname
- Basha (disambiguation)
