= Pacha =

Pacha may refer to:

- Pacha (dish), a Persian word in many languages for boiled cow or sheep feet.
- Pacha (Inca mythology), a concept of space-time and the spheres of the cosmos

In Afghan politics:

- Bacha Khan or Pacha Khan, an Afghan leader
- Pacha Khan Zadran, a powerful militia leader, politician and Pashtun nationalist in the southeast of Afghanistan
- Sher Ali Bacha (1935–1998), Pashtun revolutionary leader

In Incan mythology:

- Mama Pacha, a dragoness fertility goddess who presided over planting and harvesting in Incan mythology
- Pacha Kamaq, the deity worshipped in the city of Pachacamac by the Ichma
- Uku Pacha, the underworld located beneath the Earth's surface in Incan mythology

In other fields:

- Alternative spelling of Pasha, a Turkish military and government rank
- Pacha (The Emperor's New Groove), a character in the Disney franchise The Emperor's New Groove
- Presidential Advisory Council on HIV/AIDS, a commission formed by then-President Bill Clinton in 1995 to provide recommendations on the U.S. government's response to the AIDS epidemic
- Pacha Group, a multinational nightclub franchise based in Spain
- Cesar Pachà, a Chilean-Swedish footballer
- David Pacha, a member of the National Parliament of the Solomon Islands

== See also ==
- Bacha (disambiguation)
- Basha (disambiguation)
- Pasha (disambiguation)
- Badshah (disambiguation)
- Roots of Pacha
