= Shah of Shahs =

Shah of Shahs can refer to:

- Shahanshah, a title meaning "Shah of Shahs"
  - Shahanshah (disambiguation), other possible meanings of Shahanshah
- Shah of Shahs (book), a book by Ryszard Kapuściński
