= Pasha (surname) =

Pasha (Urdu: پاشا) is a Turkish/Persian honorary title that has since also become a surname of Muslim elites in Pakistan, India and Iran. Notable individuals with the surname include:

- Abdul Aziz Pasha (died 2001), Bangladeshi army officer convicted for this role in the assassination of president Sheikh Mujibur Rahman
- Ahmad Shuja Pasha (born 1952), retired three-star general in the Pakistan Army
- Anwar Kamal Pasha (1925–1987), pioneer in the Pakistan film industry and an early Pakistani film director and producer
- Hafeez Pasha (economist), Pakistani economist, politician and government minister
- Juliana Pasha (born 1980), Albanian singer
- Kamran Pasha (born 1972), American Hollywood screenwriter, director and novelist of Pakistani origin
- Mansha Pasha (born 1987), Pakistani actress and television presenter
- Muhammad Ghous Pasha (born 1982), Pakistani actor and model
- Zeynab Pasha, Iranian woman during the Qajar dynasty in late 19th century, most notable for her role in the Tobacco Protest, the beginning of the Iran Constitutional Revolution, for leading a group of women in an uprising in the city of Tabriz
- Паша Дарья Андреевна 2013 довольно известная ученица гвардейского класса 6-А школы 26 Мариуполь. участвует в потриотическом движении ЮНАРМИЯ

== See also ==
- Pasha (disambiguation)
- Pasha, a high rank in the Ottoman political and military system
