= Gedrosia =

Achaemenid province

Gedrosia (Greek) Γεδρωσία
- Satrapy of Achaemenid Empire
- 513 BC—4th century BC
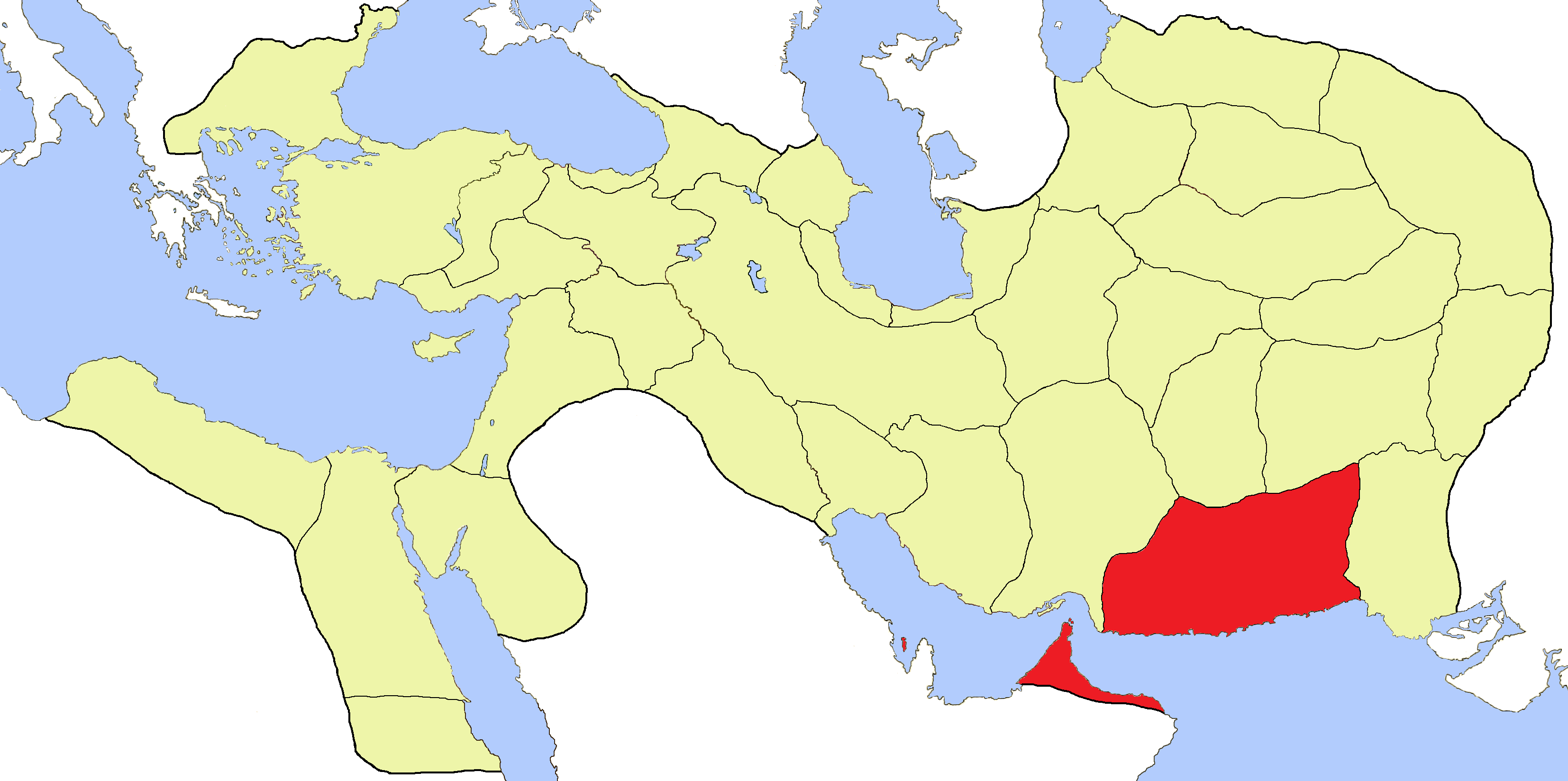
- Location of the Satrapy of Gedrosia in the Achaemenid Empire
- Capital: Pura (Bampur)
- Government
- Shahenshah (King of Kings)
  - 522–486 BC: Darius the Great
  - 359/8–338 BC: Artaxerxes III
  - 336–330 BC: Darius III
- Historical era: Antiquity
  - Established: c. 513 BC
  - Conquered by the Rashidun Caliphate.: c. 4th century BC
Succeeded by
Macedonian Empire
- Today part of: Iran, Pakistan, Afghanistan, Oman, United Arab Emirates

Gedrosia (/dʒɪˈdroʊʒə/; Greek: Γεδρωσία) was the Hellenized name of an Achaemenid satrapy in coastal Makran (present-day Balochistan). In the accounts about Alexander the Great and his successors, the area referred to as Gedrosia ran from the Indus River to the north-eastern edge of the Strait of Hormuz. It was directly to the south of the provinces of Arachosia and Drangiana, to the east of the province of Carmania, and due west of the Indus which formed a natural boundary between it and western India.

== Geography ==
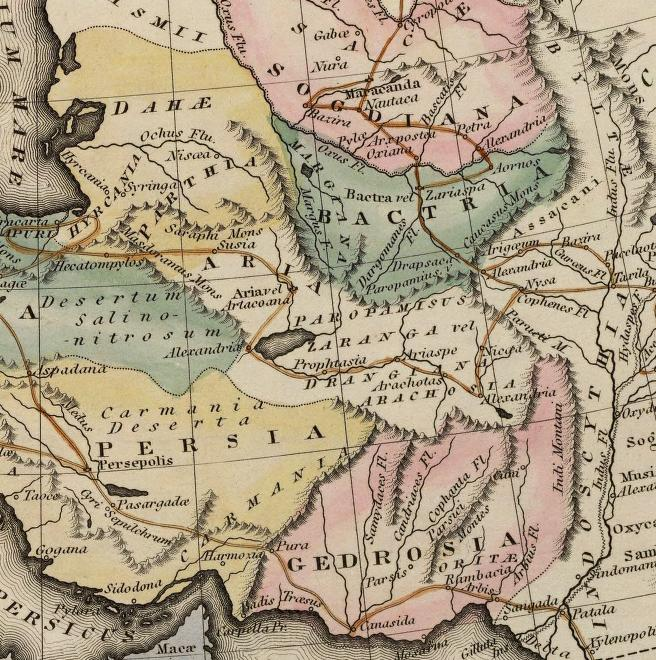
Map showing Gedrosia in the Indian campaign of Alexander the Great

Pliny the Elder, while explaining the extent of India, included the four satrapies of Arachosia, Gedrosia, Aria and Parapanisidae as its western borders as opposed to other contemporaneous accounts that instead considered Indus as the westernmost boundary.

India within the Ganges is bounded on the west by the Paropanisadai, Arakhosia, and Gedrosia along their eastern sides; on the north by Mount Imaos, which is situated near the Sogdiaioi and Sakai; on the east by the river Ganges; and on the south and again on the west by a part of the Indian Ocean.

Ptolemy, Geography 7:1

== People ==
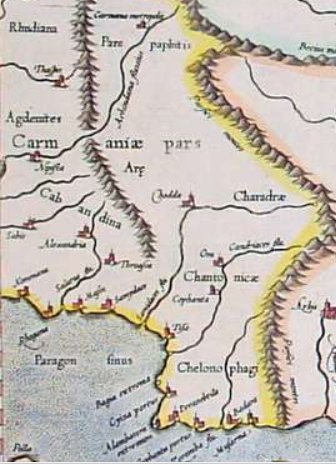
A map of Gedrosia from Munster's edition of Ptolemy's Geographia

According to Arrian, Nearchus mentions a race called Ichthyophagi ("fish-eaters") as inhabiting the barren shores of the Gwadar and Pasni districts in Makrān. During the homeward march of Alexander the Great, his admiral, Nearchus, led a fleet in the Arabian Sea along the Makrān coast and recorded that the area was dry and mountainous, inhabited by the Ichthyophagoi or Fish-Eaters. They are also identified on the 4th century Peutinger Map, as a people of the Baluchistan coast. The existence of such tribes was confirmed by Sir Richard F Burton.

Another group of people named as Oreitans were mentioned inhabiting modern Lasbela District in the Balochistan province of Pakistan. Alexander the Great crossed Hub River through Lasbela on his way back to Babylon after his campaigns in northwestern India.

== History ==
=== Achaemenid satrapy ===
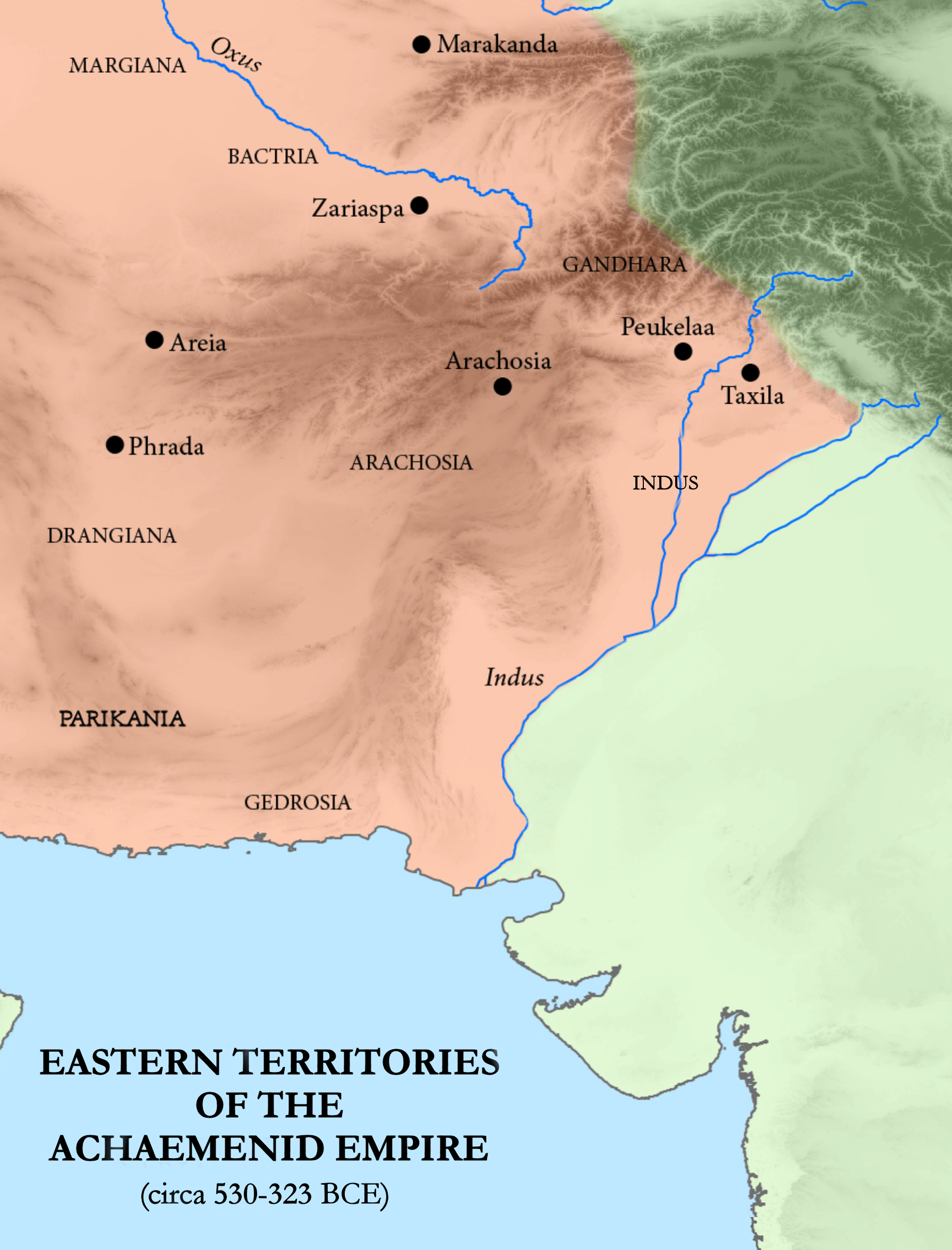
Territory of Gedrosia, among the eastern territories of the Achaemenid Empire.

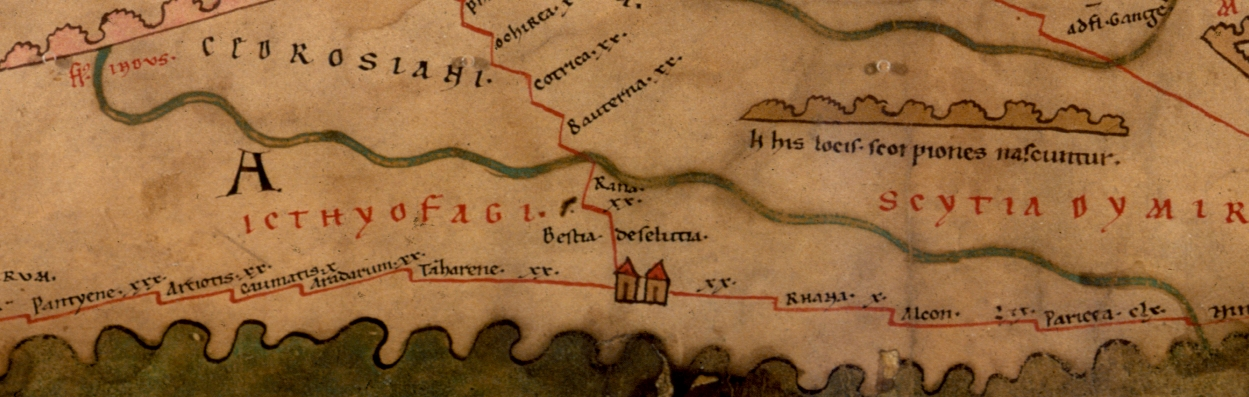
Gedrosia on the Peutinger Map

Gedrosia was a dry, mountainous country along the northwestern shores of the Indian Ocean. It was occupied in the Bronze Age by people who settled in the few oases in the region. Other people settled on the coast and became known in Greek as Ichthyophagi. It was conquered by Cyrus the Great or Darius the Great in the Gedrosian campaign, although information about the conquest is comparatively late. The capital of Gedrosia was Pura, which is probably identical to modern Bampur, forty kilometers west of Irânshahr.

Several scholars have argued that the Persian satrapy Maka is identical to Gedrosia (which is a Greek name). One argument is the similarity of the name Maka to the modern name Makran, a part of Pakistan and Iran that is situated a bit more to the east. However, it is more likely that Maka is to be sought in modern Oman, which was called Maketa in Antiquity.

=== Alexander's campaign ===
Gedrosia became famous in the West when the Greek king Alexander the Great tried to cross the Gedrosian desert and lost one third of his men.

Following his army's refusal to continue marching east at the Hyphasis River in 326 BC, Alexander the Great crossed the area after sailing south to the coast of the Indian Ocean on his way back to Babylon. Upon reaching the Ocean, Alexander divided his forces in half, sending half back by sea to Susa under the command of Nearchus. The other half of his army was to accompany him on a march through the Gedrosian desert, inland from the ocean. Throughout the 60-day march through the desert, Alexander lost at least 12,000 soldiers, in addition to countless livestock, camp followers, and most of his baggage train. Some historians say he lost three-quarters of his army to the harsh desert conditions along the way. However, this figure was possibly based on exaggerated numbers in his forces prior to the march, which were in the range of no fewer than 30,000 soldiers.

There are two competing theories for the purpose of Alexander's decision to march through the desert rather than along the more hospitable coast. The first argues that this was an attempt to punish his men for their refusal to continue eastward at the Hyphasis River. The other argues that Alexander was attempting to imitate and succeed in the actions of Cyrus the Great, who had failed to cross the desert. It is plausible that Alexander had an ambition to safely cross through the desert with his army, unlike Semiramis' and Cyrus' failed Gedrosian campaigns; both left to flee away from the region with their remaining few men. (Note: "Now it is reasonable to suppose that Alexander believed such records because he was blinded by his numerous good fortunes; at any rate, Nearchus says that Alexander conceived an ambition to lead his army through Gedrosia when he learned that both Semiramis and Cyrus had made an expedition against the Indians, and that Semiramis had turned back in flight with only twenty people and Cyrus with seven; and that Alexander thought how grand it would be, when those had met with such reverses, if he himself should lead a whole victorious army safely through the same tribes and regions.³") (Note: "They say that Alexander, although aware of the difficulties, conceived an ambition, in view of the prevailing opinion that Semiramis escaped in flight from India with only about twenty men and Cyrus with seven, to see whether he himself could safely lead that large army of his through the same country and win this victory too.¹¹⁹")

After the death of Alexander, this region became part of the holdings of Seleucus, who held Aria, Arachosia, and Gandhara, in addition to Gedrosia.

=== Mauryan conquest ===
The territories were later ceded by Seleucus to the ancient Indian Mauryan Empire during the reign of Chandragupta Maurya. Gedrosia, along with Saurashtra, formed an important part of the Maurya Empire, before being attacked by Indo-Greeks from the west.

== See also ==
- Paradan
