= Bhasa (disambiguation) =

Bhasa or Bhāsa was a Sanskrit playwright in ancient India, best known as the author of the romantic play Svapnavasavadattam.

It can also refer to:

- Bhāṣā or bahasa, the Sanskrit word for language
  - Newar language, known officially in Nepal as Nepal Bhasa
- Bhasa, Bishnupur, a census town in West Bengal, India

== See also ==
- Baasha (disambiguation)
