= Badshahi Angti =

Badshahi Angti (transl. The Emperor's Ring) may refer to:

- Badshahi Angti (novel), a 1969 novel by Satyajit Ray
- Badshahi Angti (film), a 2014 Indian film directed by Sandip Ray, based on the novel

== See also ==
- Badshah (disambiguation)
