= Bacha (given name) =

Bacha is a given name. Notable people with the name include:

- Bacha Khan (disambiguation)
- Bacha Pathak, Indian politician
- Bacha Zareen (1942–2012), Pakistani singer
