= Gedrosian campaign =

Achaemenid Persian campaign into India

Gedrosian campaign of Cyrus
- Part of the Campaigns of Cyrus the Great
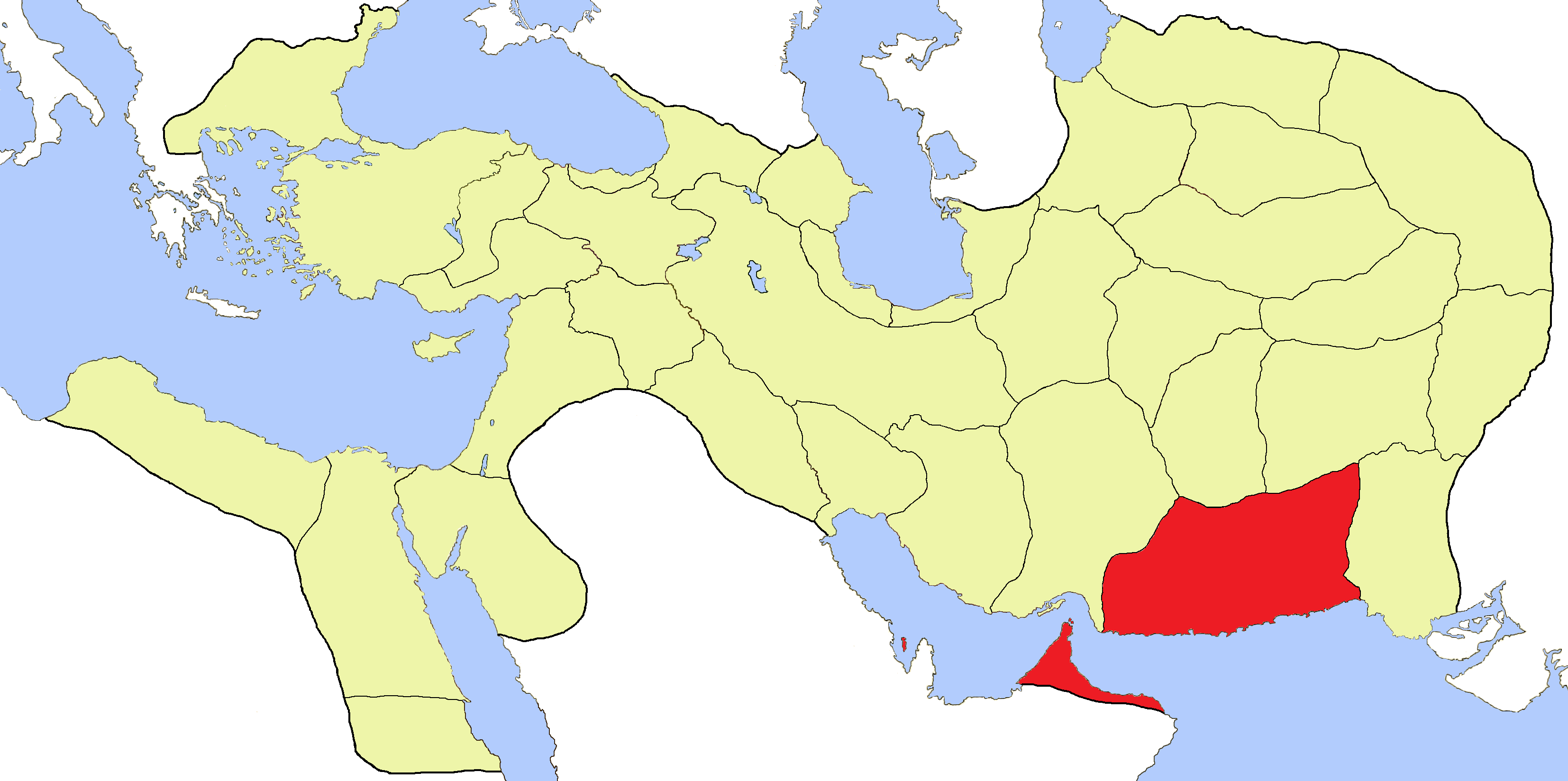
Location	Gedrosia (present-day Balochistan region divided between Pakistan and Iran)
Result	decisive Hindu victory

Belligerents
Hindus	Achaemenid Empire

Commanders and leaders
Pukkusāti (possibly) (Note: According to the scholar Buddha Prakash, Pukkusāti might have acted as a bulwark against the expansion of the Persian Achaemenid Empire into the north-west Indian Subcontinent. This hypothesis posits that the army which Nearchus claimed Cyrus had lost in Gedrosia had in fact been defeated by Pukkusāti's Gāndhārī kingdom. Therefore, following Prakash's position, the Achaemenids would have been able to conquer Gandhāra only after a period of decline of Gandhāra after the reign of Pukkusāti combined the growth of Achaemenid power under the kings Cambyses II and Darius I.)	Cyrus (AWOL)

Casualties and losses
Unknown	Entire army annihilated (except Cyrus with 7 men escaped in flight) (Note: "Now it is reasonable to suppose that Alexander believed such records because he was blinded by his numerous good fortunes; at any rate, Nearchus says that Alexander conceived an ambition to lead his army through Gedrosia when he learned that both Semiramis and Cyrus had made an expedition against the Indians, and that Semiramis had turned back in flight with only twenty people and Cyrus with seven; and that Alexander thought how grand it would be, when those had met with such reverses, if he himself should lead a whole victorious army safely through the same tribes and regions.³") (Note: "They say that Alexander, although aware of the difficulties, conceived an ambition, in view of the prevailing opinion that Semiramis escaped in flight from India with only about twenty men and Cyrus with seven, to see whether he himself could safely lead that large army of his through the same country and win this victory too.¹¹⁹")

The Gedrosian campaign of Cyrus the Great or Cyrus' Indian expedition was a military expedition of the Achaemenids which took place in Gedrosia (in the modern-day Balochistan region) against the Hindus or Indians.

== Background ==
According to Herodotus, after the rise of Cyrus the Great, he went on to conquer numerous states. He also built a city named Cyropolis which is located at Sogdia. Pliny suggests numerous campaigns of Cyrus the Great into the regions near Kabul.

== Campaign ==
The Achaemenid Army struggled greatly in the deserts of Gedrosia. In this expedition, he is said to have lost much of his army in the desert, marking a remarkable defeat and retreat of the Persians. (Note: After the conquest of Lydia, Cyrus campaigned in the east between around 545 BC to 540 BC. Cyrus first tried to conquer Gedrosia, however he was decisively defeated and departed Gedrosia.)

== Aftermath ==
There is no evidence of Cyrus subjugating Gedrosia, and it has been described by various historians that it was most likely under Darius the Great when this region came under Persian control. The difficulties faced by Cyrus the Great were also observed during the Gedrosrian campaign of Alexander the Great.
