= Horizon Lines =

American shipping company

Coordinates: 35.015268°N 80.822992°W

Horizon Lines, Inc.
- Company type: Publicly traded
- Traded as: HRZL (delisted)
- Founded: 1956
- Fate: sold in 2015
- Successor: Matson Navigation Company
- Headquarters: Charlotte, North Carolina, United States
- Services: Container shipping, terminals, and ferry.
- Operating income: USD 1033 million (2013)
- Total assets: USD 624 million (2013)
- Number of employees: 1,621 (2013)
- Website: www.horizonlines.com

Horizon Lines, Inc. was an American domestic ocean shipping and logistics company headquartered in Charlotte, North Carolina. It was the largest Jones Act-compliant maritime shipping and logistics company, and accounted for approximately 37 per cent of all U.S. container shipments linking the continental United States to Alaska, Hawaii and Puerto Rico. Under the Jones Act, maritime shipments between U.S. ports is restricted to U.S.-built, owned, and flagged vessels operated by predominantly U.S.-citizen crews. The company originated from Sea-Land Service, Inc. The domestic liner operations of Sea-Land were sold in 2003 and thereafter operated under the name Horizon Lines. Horizon became a publicly traded company on the New York Stock Exchange in 2005. In 2015 the company was acquired by Matson Navigation Company.

== Scope of operations ==
Horizon owned a fleet of 13 Jones Act-compliant container ships as recently as 2014, approximately 31,000 cargo containers, and operated cargo terminals in Alaska, Hawaii, and Puerto Rico. Approximately 150 port calls were made each year in Tacoma, Washington for service between Alaska or Hawaii. Until November 2011, the company ran trans-Pacific service to Guam and China. It also contracted for terminal services in seven ports in the continental United States. Its primary customers were consumer and industrial products companies, as well as various agencies of the U.S. government, including the Department of Defense and the U.S. Postal Service. It also offered shipping services of vehicles and household belongings.

Horizon met with criticism within the investor community due to the age of some of its vessels. In the world fleet container ships go to the scrap yard at age 28 while Horizon still maintained C6 and C7 Lancer Class steam powered vessels. One such vessel, SS Horizon Discovery (ex-American Liberty), was built in 1968 for the now defunct United States Lines.

== Department of Justice controversy and litigation ==
In May 2011 the U.S. Department of Justice reduced the fine levied the previous month after the company pleaded guilty to price-fixing in the Puerto Rico market from $45 million to $15 million. The reduction was attributed to pressure from bondholders and the possibility that Horizon would declare bankruptcy after losing a contract with Danish shipping group Maersk Line.

In October 2011, the company completed a $653 million refinancing move to avoid bankruptcy. On October 20, 2011, the New York Stock Exchange suspended trading of Horizon's stock because it had fallen below its $15 million continued listing standard for average global market capitalization over a consecutive 30-day trading period. The company stock then traded on the OTCQB market.

In November 2011, the company agreed to settle with the remaining shippers who opted out of the "Puerto Rico direct purchaser antitrust class action settlement" for $13.75 million On 28 January 2012, the company reached an agreement with the U.S. Department of Justice to plead guilty to two counts of providing falsified oil record-keeping documents from a vessel in the U.S. West Coast-Hawaii service. The company paid a fine of $1 million and donated an additional $500,000 to the National Fish & Wildlife Foundation. The company agreed to be placed on probation for three years and to institute an environmental compliance plan.

== Company sale and close of operations ==
In November 2014 Horizon Lines announced that it had reached formal agreements to sell the entire company. Alaska operations were bought by Matson, Inc. for $469 million while, following regulatory approval, its Hawaii trade-lane business was acquired by The Pasha Group. Service to Puerto Rico ended in December 2014. The company cited continued losses and struggles to operate and maintain its steam-powered fleet. The company had previously reduced its Puerto Rico service in an effort to reduce costs. The sale of the last part of the company was finalized on 29 May 2015.
