= Pasa =

Pasa may refer to:

== People ==
- Paša Gackić (1947–2022), Bosnian soprano, opera soloist and music pedagogue
- Pasa of Silla, the fifth ruler of Silla, one of the Three Kingdoms of Korea
- Paşa (disambiguation), common Turkish surname and title

== Titles ==
- Pasha (Turkish: Paşa), an honorary title granted to officials of the Ottoman Empire

== Other ==
- Pan African Sanctuary Alliance
- Pasa, Iran
- Savoonga Airport, ICAO code PASA
- Parachute Association of South Africa
- Pāśa, a concept in Indian philosophy
- Paasam, a 1962 Indian film by T. R. Ramanna

== See also ==
- Pasha (disambiguation)
