= Shahanshah (disambiguation) =

Shahanshah is a title given to the Iranian Shahs (kings/emperors), meaning King of Kings (Shah of Shahs).

Shahanshah or Shahenshah may also refer to:

- Shahanshah, Lorestan, a village in Iran
- Shahanshah (Shirvanshah), the 22nd Shirvanshah
- Shahenshah (1953 film), a 1953 Indian Hindi-language historical drama film by Amiya Chakravarty, starring Ranjan and Kamini Kaushal
- Shahenshah (1988 film), a 1988 Indian Hindi-language action film by Tinnu Anand, starring Amitabh Bachchan in the title role
  - Amitabh Bachchan (born 1942), Indian film actor, nicknamed the "Shahenshah of Bollywood"
- Shahen-Shah, a 1988 album by Nusrat Fateh Ali Khan
- Shahenshah (2020 film), a 2020 Bangladeshi romantic action film by Shamim Ahamed Roni, featuring Shakib Khan in the title role
- Shahenshah (novel), a 1970 Marathi-language novel by Indian writer N. S. Inamdar
- al-Afdal Shahanshah, Fatimid vizier in Cairo
- Shahanshah, son of Muhammad III of Alamut

== See also ==
- Shah (disambiguation)
- Padishah (disambiguation)
- Badshah (disambiguation)
- King of Kings (disambiguation), literal translation of shahanshah
- List of shahanshahs of the Sasanian Empire
- List of monarchs of Persia
- Iranian monarchy
