= Abdel Rahman El Bacha =

Lebanese pianist and composer

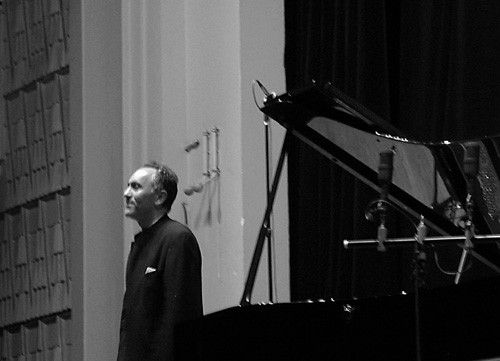
Abdel Rahman El Bacha on the concert at théatre St Victor-Mutualité, Paris. 2 March 2006

Abdel Rahman El Bacha (Arabic: عبد الرحمن الباشا, born October 23, 1958) is a Lebanese pianist and composer.

His repertory includes over fifty concertos and is largely based on the works of Bach, Mozart, Beethoven, Chopin, Schubert, Schumann, Rachmaninoff, Ravel and Prokofiev.

== Biography ==
El Bacha was born in Beirut, Lebanon, in 1958 to a family of musicians - his father was a well-known composer and his mother was the famous singer Wedad. He remarked in an interview that his mother possessed a sharp ear for music without the ability to read it in written form, and that this taught him the importance of learning music by ear.

He began his piano schooling in 1967 at the age of nine with Zvart Sarkissian (a pupil of Marguerite Long and Jacques Février). At the age of ten, he gave his first concert with an orchestra.

He was offered scholarships in France, the United Kingdom and then USSR. He opted for France, studying at the Paris Conservatoire and graduating from there with four prizes: piano, chamber music, harmony and counterpoint.

At the age of 19, in June 1978, El Bacha won the Queen Elisabeth Music Competition by a unanimous judgment. He was also awarded the Audience Prize at the same competition.

In 1983, he made his first recording for the label Forlane, Early Works by Sergei Prokofiev. It won the Grand Prix de l'Académie Charles Cros, presented to him by Prokofiev's widow.

He was recently awarded the Médaille de l’Ordre du Mérite by the President of the Lebanese Republic, the highest distinction of his native country.

El Bacha has had Franco-Lebanese dual nationality since 1981, and has lived in Brussels, Belgium since 2014.
