= Baasha =

Baasha (Hebrew: בַּעְשָׁא Baʿshāʾ) may refer to:

- Baasha of Israel, third king of the northern Israelite Kingdom of Israel
  - Elah son of Baasha
- Baasha of Ammon, king of Ammon in the 850s B.C.

Baasha may also refer to:

- Madras Baasha, dialect of Tamil spoken in Chennai, India
- Telangana Baasha, dialect of Telugu spoken in Telangana, India
- Baashha or Baasha (Badshah), 1995 Indian Tamil film

== See also ==
- Basha (disambiguation)
- Bhasa (disambiguation)
