= Bacha Khan (disambiguation) =

Bacha Khan is an alternate name for Abdul Ghaffar Khan, a Pashtun political leader.

Bacha Khan may also refer to:

== People ==
- Bacha Khan (Afghan politician), appointed Governor of Paktia Province, see 2002 in Afghanistan
- Bacha Khan (Guantanamo captive 529), see Timeline of the release and transfer of Guantanamo Bay detainees
- Pacha Khan Zadran, regional militia leader who rose against the Taliban in 2001, was considered a "renegade" in 2003, and was elected to the Wolesi Jirga in 2004
- Mir Bacha Khan, Tajik chief during the Anglo-Afghan wars

== Other ==
- Bacha Khan International Airport, an international airport in Peshawar, Khyber Pakhtunkhwa, Pakistan
- Bacha Khan University, a public university in Charsadda, Khyber Pakhtunkhwa, Pakistan
- Bacha Khan Medical College, a public medical institution in Mardan, Khyber Pakhtunkhwa, Pakistan
