= Padishah (disambiguation) =

Padishah is a title of nobility roughly meaning 'emperor' in Persian languages, primarily used for the Sultan of the Ottoman Empire.

Padshah, Padshah, Badshah or Padişah may also refer to:

== Imperial/royal ruler styles ==
- Sultan of the Ottoman Empire, also referred to as the Padishah
- Padshah-i Hind, the main title of the 'Great Mughal', paramount ruler of Hindustan (India)
- Padishah Bahadur, meaning 'a rank above Padshah'
- Padshah-e Awadh, assumed by the former Nawabs of Awadh

== Fictional rulers ==
- Padishah Emperor of the Known Universe, in Frank Herbert's Dune novels
- The ruler of the Empire of Kelesh in the Pathfinder Roleplaying Game

== Other uses ==
- Padshah (Zabul), an Afghan appointed to Afghanistan's First Constitutional Loya Jirga, see Constitutional Loya Jirga
- Padishah Khatun (1256-1295), Mongol poet and empress

== See also ==
- Padishah Bahadur
- Badshah (disambiguation)
