= Golden Divas Baatein With Badshah =

Indian television chat show

Lux Golden Divas Baatein With Badshah is a 2017 Indian chat show hosted by Shah Rukh Khan. The show was broadcast in 2017 on StarPlus.

== Overview ==
Lux Golden Divas Baatein is a Hindi talk show that invites celebrities to talk about their personal life and aims to uncover the unseen sides of Bollywood stars. Many celebrities including Kreena Kapoor, Alia Bhatt, Madhuri Dixit, and Deepika Padukone have appeared in the show.

== Cast ==
- Shahrukh Khan as host
