= Baadshah (soundtrack) =

Soundtrack album by S. Thaman
- Released: 27 February 2013
- Recorded: 2012
- Genre: Feature film soundtrack
- Length: 23:41
- Language: Telugu
- Label: Aditya Music
- Producer: S. Thaman

S. Thaman chronology
| Shadow (2013) | Baadshah (2013) | Greeku Veerudu (2013) |

Baadshah is the feature film soundtrack of the 2013 Telugu film of the same name starring Jr. NTR and Kajal Aggarwal in the lead roles directed by Srinu Vaitla. The soundtrack consists of 6 Tracks all composed by S. Thaman with Ramajogayya Sastry penning 3 of them and Krishna Chaitanya, Viswa, Bhaskarabhatla Ravikumar penning each. The Soundtrack Album was released by Aditya Music on 27 February 2013 which coincided with a heavy yet catastrophic promotional event held at Ramanaidu Studios which is located at Nanakramguda of Hyderabad on the same day. The audio received positive response from the critics.

== Production ==
S. Thaman was roped in as the music director of the film which marks his second collaboration with Jr. NTR after Brindavanam and with Srinu Vaitla after Dookudu. Music Sitting Discussions were held at Ooty in May 2012. By June 2012, Thaman reported that he completed 3 songs and is working hard early mornings for fast & better results. In the same month, reports emerged that the film's lead actress Kajal Aggarwal would make her debut as a Playback singer by singing a song in this film as per Thaman's request. In July 2012, Popular R&B singer Akon was said to be roped in to sing a song in this film. Added to this, speculations arose that Akon and Kajal would croon together for a peppy song in the album. However Kajal dismissed the rumors that she was going to sing in this or any other film further adding that he was totally baffled after hearing this news. The makers dropped the idea of roping in Akon due to his non-availability due to busy schedules and remuneration which was near to ₹3 crore (US$310,000). In August 2012, Thaman went to Bangkok to record the Theme song of the film. He joined hands with the famous Bangkok philharmonic orchestra. Singers Ranjith, Rahul Nambiar and Suchitra who accompanied him to Bangkok provided the additional vocals and all of them returned to Chennai later. In September 2012, the scratch version of the song "Sairo Sairo" was leaked into the Internet. The song received enormously positive response almost turning a chartbuster with many praising Thaman's work as different from his old tunes. In February 2013, It was revealed that Tamil actor Simbu sang the song "Diamond Girl", which marks his first song in Telugu. Along with this, another song was crooned by Daler Mehndi. Coincidentally, both songs were penned by Ramajogayya Sastry. However, speculations arose that Simbu replaced Akon for this project later, which were left unanswered.

== Release ==
The audio was launched at Ramanaidu Studios located at Nanakramguda in Hyderabad, India through Aditya Music label on 27 February 2013. Dil Raju, S. S. Rajamouli, Jr. NTR, Srinu Vaitla, Bandla Ganesh, Simbu, S. Thaman, Daler Mehndi, V. V. Vinayak and others graced the function. Kajal Aggarwal, who was busy shooting for All in All Azhagu Raja couldn't make it to the audio launch as she missed her Spicejet flight from Coimbatore to Hyderabad. However, she spoke to the media and audience through a video message. The audio launch turned a catastrophic incident as Rajendra Prasad a.k.a. Raju, a diehard fan of Jr. NTR died in a stampede unfortunately which made Jr. NTR and the unit to conclude the audio launch then and there fastly. Bandla Ganesh made an announcement that he would be paying 0.5 million rupees as exgratia to Raju's family and Jr. NTR promised to extend his support to the deceased's family. This made the film unit celebrate the success of the audio on 9 March 2013 by a Hexa Platinum Disc Function held at Novotel in Hyderabad in a silent and simple manner.

== Track list ==
Track list
| No. | Title | Lyrics | Artist(s) | Length |
|---|---|---|---|---|
| 1. | "Sairo Sairo" | Krishna Chaitanya | Ranjith, Rahul Nambiar, Naveen Madhav | 3:47 |
| 2. | "Diamond Girl" | Ramajogayya Sastry | Suchitra, Silambarasan | 4:14 |
| 3. | "Baadshah" | Viswa | Geetha Madhuri, Hemachandra, Shefali Alvares, Mahesh Babu (Voice Over) | 3:48 |
| 4. | "Banthi Poola Janaki" | Ramajogayya Sastry | Daler Mehndi, Ranina Reddy | 4:23 |
| 5. | "Welcome Kanakkam" | Bhaskarabhatla Ravi Kumar | Sowmya Raoh, Jaspreet Jasz | 4:02 |
| 6. | "Rangoli Rangoli" | Ramajogayya Sastry | Divya Kumar, Sonu Kakkar, Chorus | 3:33 |
| Total length: | | | | 28:15 |

== Reception ==
The audio got positive response from critics. 123telugu gave a review stating "Thaman has come up with a very peppy and entertaining music album for Baadshah. Baadshah is gearing up to be a treat for fans and the music album is no different." Apherald gave a review stating "The entire album sounds like Thaman has patched up all best tunes he composed till date and put up a sweet coated layer of Baadshah on them." Musicperk gave a positive review terming the album a "Mass Package". Gulte gave a review stating "On a whole, the album of Baadshah scored by SS Thaman looks enthralling for the kind of new-wave music and is impressive. However, like all those Thaman's past movies, this album will keep ringing everywhere when the movie hits marquee." Cinema65 gave a review stating "Finally Thaman given a Good album to NTR, Taking Dookudu As a Inspiration will makes something like a Duplicate but repeated hearing of song will rock shake your audio systems, A power packed song by Thaman which give a great chance to show the NTR Dancing performances in music." Cinecorn gave a review stating "SS Thaman delivers for Young Tiger NTR once again after Brindavanam. Despite the expected 'routine beats' criticism the album might get, it's a winner from word go. Young Tiger NTR should dance his way to a hit with an album like this" and rated the album 3.5/5. Milliblog gave a review stating "Usual, likeable mass'y music from Thaman." 143Cinema gave a review stating "Overall its a Good album for NTR fans, other it will be an OK, with the hype around this movie everyone expected a lot from this combo especially after Brindavanam" and rated the album 7/10. way2movies gave a review stating "Undoubtedly, Thaman delivered a pretty entertaining album with Baadshah that give ample scope for NTR's dances. The songs are high on energy and have the potential to woo masses and fans. The choice of the singers added the attraction to the album. Well, let's wait to watch the visuals and NTR's dances on 5 April. Listen to the 'Massy yet Entertaining' Baadshah album." Cineoutlook gave a review stating "Overall Baadashah Audio is a combination of Class and Mass Masala songs" and rated the album 4/5.
