= Basha =

Basha may refer to:

- Baasha (king), a Hebrew king
- Barbara Baranowska (born February 17, 1934), also known as Basha, an artist from the Polish School of Posters
- Basha (film) (Badshah), a 1995 Indian Tamil-language gangster film by Suresh Krissna
- Basha: The Boss, Hindi title of Balram vs. Tharadas, a 2006 Indian Malayalam-language film
- Basha (tarpaulin), British military slang for a shelter or sleeping area
- Arabic pronunciation of the Turkish title "Pasha", formerly used by some Arab rulers in Ottoman-influenced areas
- Basha (title), an Ethiopian rank originally derived from the Turkish "Pasha" but of lower status
- Basha, a chain of Lebanese cuisine restaurants in the Greater Montreal area

== People with the surname ==
- Amal Basha, Yemeni women's rights activist
- Arbër Basha (born 1998), Albanian footballer
- Hassan Abu Basha, Egyptian military officer and politician
- Migjen Basha (born 1987), Albanian footballer
- Lulzim Basha (born 1974), Albanian politician

== See also ==
- Baasha (disambiguation)
- Badshah (disambiguation)
- Pasha (disambiguation)
- Bacha (disambiguation)
- Bashar (disambiguation)
