= Pasha Hawaii =

American shipping company

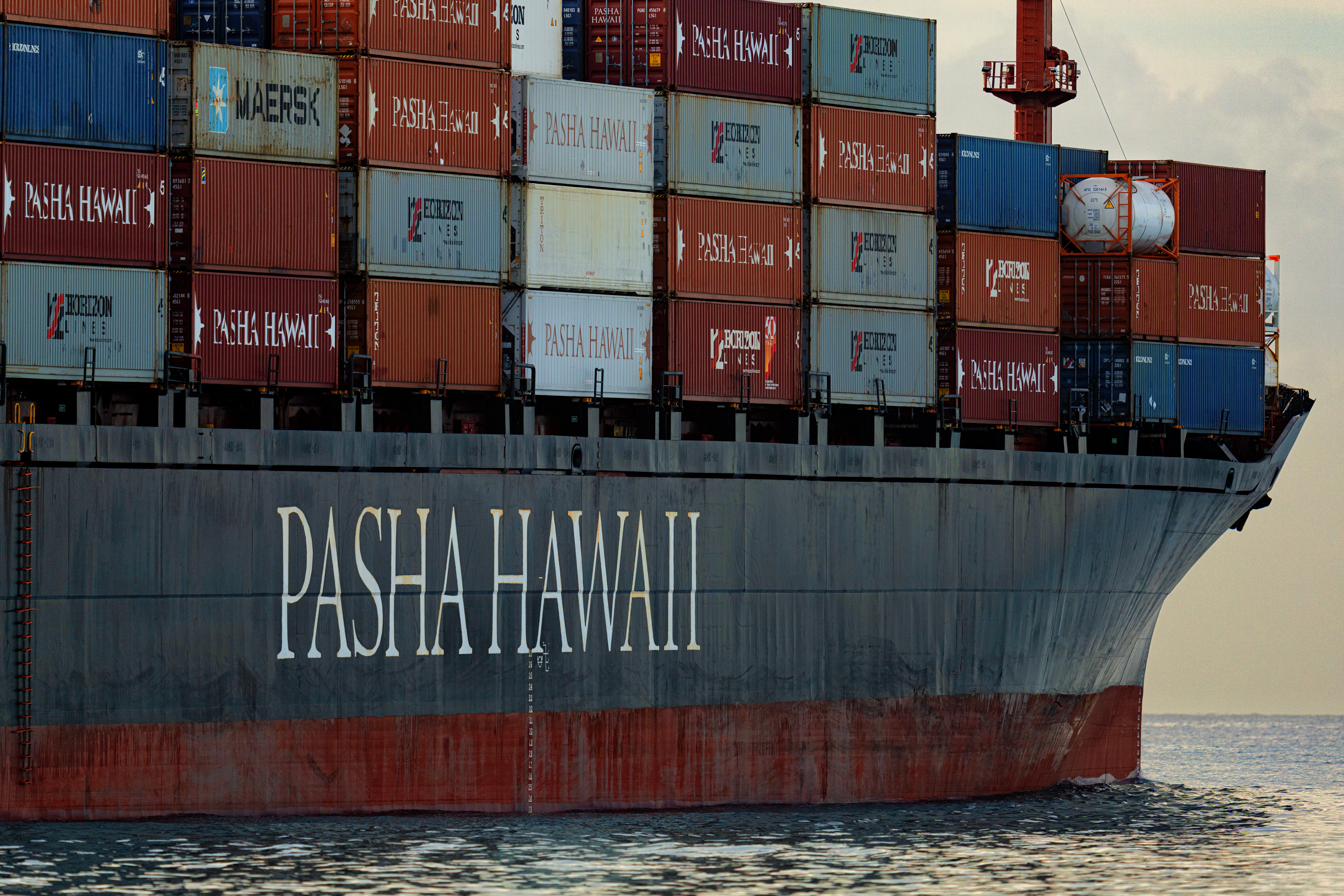
- Pasha Hawaii with containers as seen from Sand Island in Honolulu, Hawaii in 2020
- Type: Subsidiary
- Industry: Shipping
- Founded: 1949; 77 years ago
- Headquarters: United States
- Area served: Hawaii and continental United States
- Key people: George W. Pasha, IV (CEO)
- Products: Transportation between Hawaii and US mainland
- Owner: The Pasha family
- Parent: Pasha Group
- Website: pashahawaii.com

Pasha Hawaii is an American shipping company specializing in trade between Hawaii and the continental United States. It is part of the Pasha Group based in San Rafael, California. The president and CEO of the company is George W. Pasha, IV.

As of 2024, the company provided the largest transportation between the contiguous United States and Hawaii. The company owned six active vessels. The company specializes in the maritime transport and distribution of shipping containers, automobiles, trucks, trailers, mafi roll trailers, heavy construction machineries and further types of static and rolling freight.

== History ==
The company's roots to Hawaii started during World War II when the troops needed storage services. To accommodate these needs, a station was set up in San Francisco to help the deployed troops. George W. Pasha, the founder, had a large amount of acquired knowledge about the automotive industry and started the company after seeing the demand for storage and transportation. The firm dates back to 1949,. His son George W. Pasha, III, realized the potential of the company and helped formed the company into what it is today.

The company realized that there was a need for shipping goods between Hawaii and the Pacific Coast and began Pasha Hawaii in 1999.

In 2004, the firm commissioned the Jean Anne, a roll-on roll-off vessel. In 2015, the firm commissioned the Marjorie C a vessel with features of both a container vessel and ro-ro.

In 2015, Pasha Hawaii provided its Horizon Spirit to help in the Puerto Rico relief effort after Hurricane Maria. The ship transported hundreds of containers from Long Beach, California, to the Caribbean island.

In 2015, the firm purchased the Hawaii operations of competing shipping firm, Horizon Lines's.

In 2017 the International Organization of Masters, Mates & Pilots (MM&P) filed a complaint against Pasha Hawaii, before the National Labor Relations Board (NLRB). They asserted Pasha Hawaii was designing two new vessels without sharing blueprints with their organization.

The Honolulu Star-Advertiser reported, on September 19, 2017, that Pasha Hawaii announced it had ordered two new vessels to be completed in 2020. Per their report, a third shipping company, TOTE Incorporated, had announced that it too would be offering a service between Hawaii and the continental USA, competing with Pasha Hawaii and Matson.

== Fleet ==
=== Jean Anne ===
The 579-foot Jean Anne was commissioned in 2004 as the company's first ship. The Jean Anne is a ro-ro, a ship designed specifically to carry vehicles. The $90 million ship was designed to carry 3,000 vehicles on each trip. Its ports of call include Honolulu, San Diego, Kahului, Nawiliwili Kaua'i, and Hilo.

=== Marjorie C ===
The 692-foot Marjorie C was commissioned in 2015 as the company's second ship. The Marjorie C is a con-ro, a hybrid ro-ro with the ability to carry containerized cargo as well as vehicles. The ship can carry 1,200 vehicles and 1,400 TEUs of containers. The ship's ports of call include Honolulu and Los Angeles, usually carrying 30 percent cars, 10 percent oversized items, and 60 percent containers.

=== George II ===
George II, formerly the steam-powered container ship Horizon Reliance, has been modified to use liquefied natural gas (LNG). This newly repowered container ship is the first steam-to-LNG diesel conversion Pasha ordered, saving 15,000 metric tons of steel and related CO2 emissions by conserving the hull, and increasing 40' refrigerated container capacity by 110%. George II was built in New Orleans, LA. Its ports of call include Honolulu, Long Beach, and San Diego.

==== Horizon Spirit ====
The Spirit is a C9 class container ship, built in New Orleans, LA and operating in the Hawaii/Mainland trade lane.

==== MV George III ====
George III is a container ship built at Keppel AmFELS in Brownsville, Texas in 2022 to operate on LNG. it was designed for energy efficiency. The ship features a state-of-the-art engine, an optimized hull form, and an underwater propulsion system with a high-efficiency rudder and propeller. It has a capacity of 2,525 TEUs of containers. Its ports of call include Honolulu, Long Beach, and Oakland.

==== Janet Marie ====
The Janet Marie is a container ship built at Keppel AmFELS in Brownsville, Texas in 2022 to operate on LNG. it was designed for energy efficiency. The Janet Marie features a state-of-the-art engine, an optimized hull form, and an underwater propulsion system with a high-efficiency rudder and propeller. Its ports of call include Honolulu, Long Beach, and Oakland.

== Gallery ==
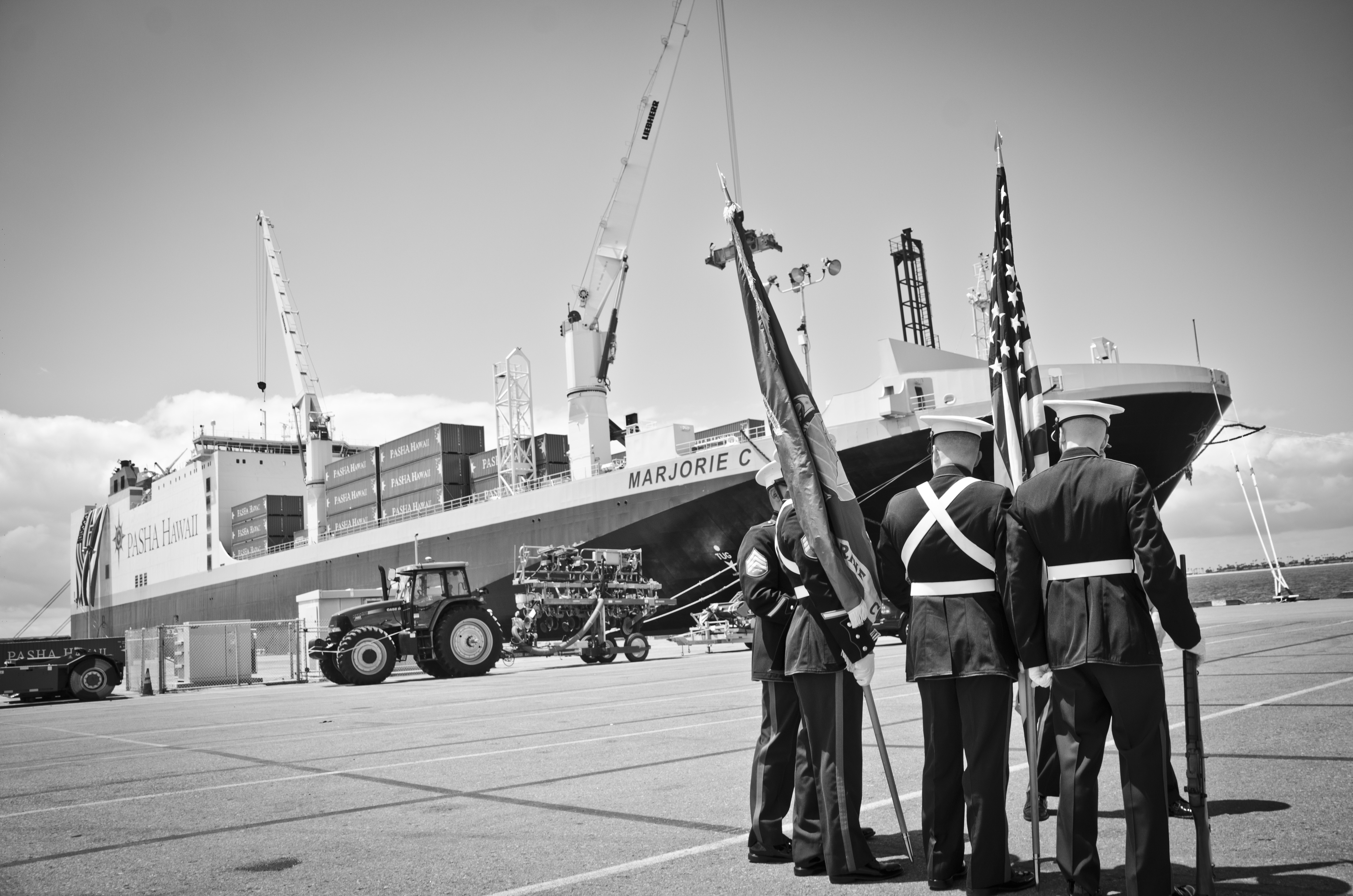
Pasha Hawaii calls the Marjorie C a "con-ro" vessel, a hybrid vessel that combines roll-on roll-off features with storage space for TEU shipping containers.

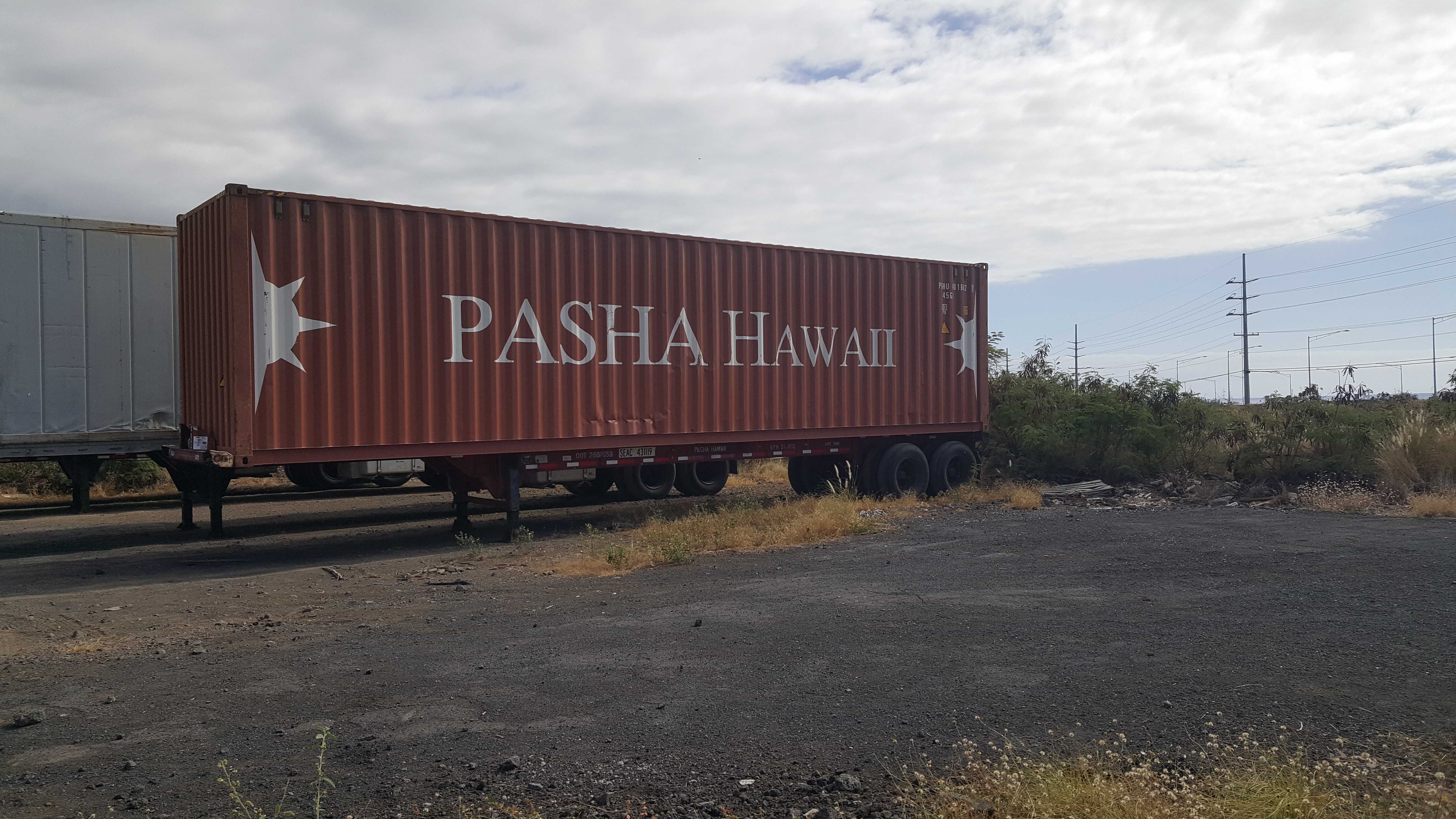
Pasha Hawaii's shipping container in Kailua Kona, Hawaii

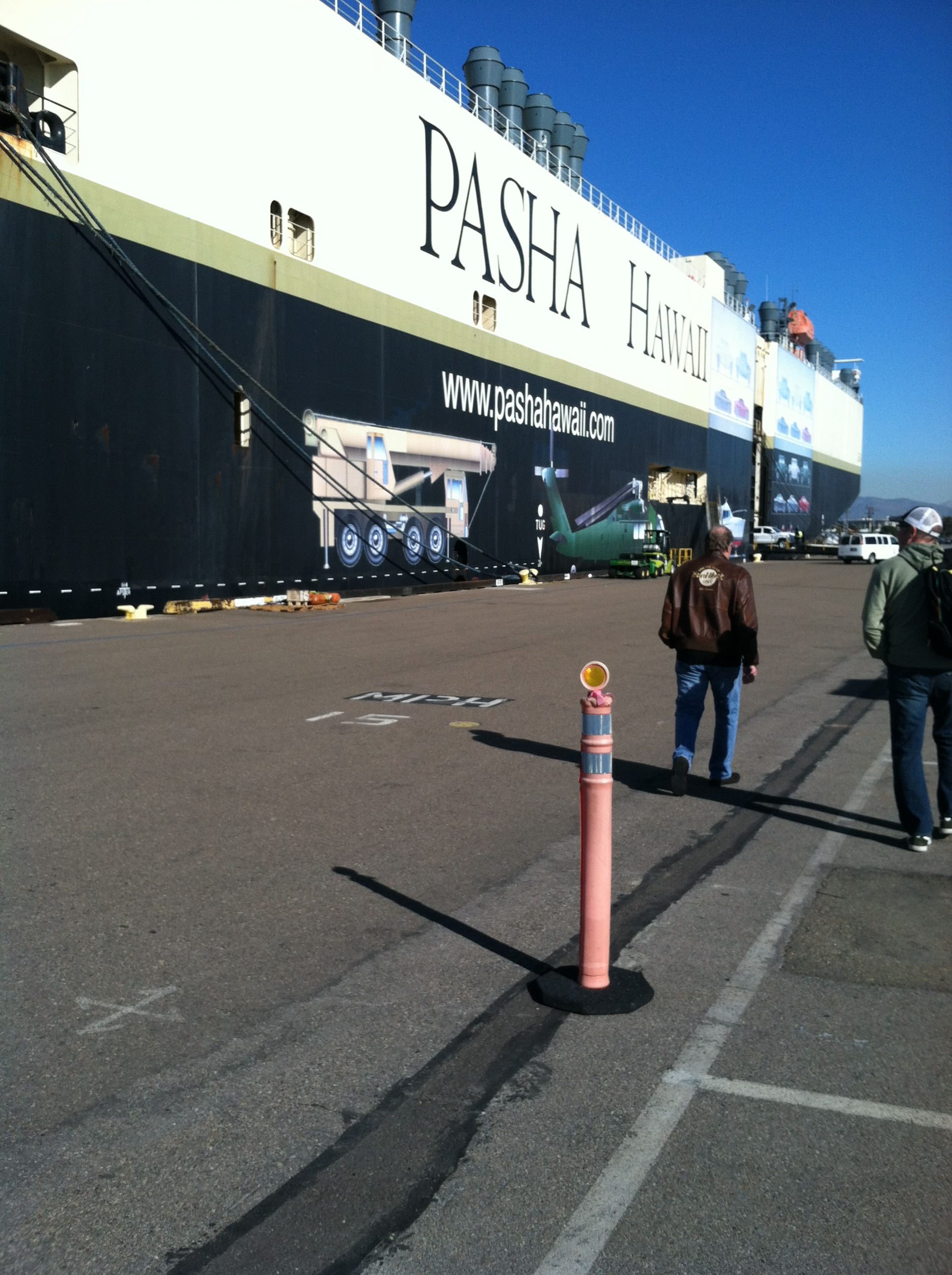
Pasha ship Jean Anne

== See also ==
- List of largest container shipping companies
- Nippon Yusen Kaisha
- American Roll-on Roll-off Carrier
- Siem Shipping
- Toyofuji Shipping
- George Berovich
- Merchant Marine Act of 1920
