= Pasha Group =

- Type: Privately held company
- Industry: Logistics
- Founded: 1942; 84 years ago
- Founder: George W. Pasha, Jr.
- Headquarters: San Rafael, California, United States
- Area served: Worldwide
- Key people: George W. Pasha (CEO)
- Products: Automotive shipping
- Owners: The Pasha family
- Number of employees: 504 (2024)
- Subsidiaries: Pasha Hawaii
- Website: www.pashagroup.com

Pasha Group is a privately held American shipping company with its headquarters in San Rafael, California. It has automobile shipping terminals at the US East Coast in Baltimore, Maryland; and the US West Coast at Aberdeen, Washington (Port of Grays Harbor), and National City, California (Port of San Diego).

== History ==
The company was established in 1942 or in 1947 as Pasha Truckaway.

In 2005, Pasha Hawaii launched the $100 million roll-on/roll-off automobile transporter M/V Jean Anne. Homeported in San Diego; and $144 million M/V Marjorie C, a combined roll-on/roll-off and 1,500 TEU containerized cargo ship, launched in 2014.

The company announced it would reopen the Port of San Francisco's Pier 80 in for automobiles in 2018.
