= Muhammad Ghous Pasha =

Pakistani actor and model (born 1982)

- Born: Muhammad Ghous Pasha; 29 November 1982 (age 43); Karachi, Sindh, Pakistan
- Occupations: Television presenter; Model
- Years active: 2006–present

Muhammad Ghous Pasha is a Pakistani actor and model. He has appeared in Urdu drama series, telefilms and sitcoms in Pakistan. He appeared in Haseena Moin's Meri Behen Maya and Mehreen Jabbar's Rehai. He made his first Lollywood film, Jalaibee, in 2013.

== Personal life ==
Ghous was born in Karachi, Pakistan.

== Career ==
Ghous started working as a model before moving on to acting. He began his television career with a small appearance in "Dil Diya Dehleez" (2009). Some other works include Massi Aur Malika, Chudween Ka Chand, Mannchalay, Kuch Unkahi Batain, Koi Jane Na, Baji, Larkiyan Muhalley Ki and Lamha Lamha Zindagi. He also appeared in telefilms including Pappu Ki Padoosan, Neeli Chatri, Love Hit Tou Life Hit, Haseena Maan Jaye Gi, and "Piano Girl".

=== Television ===
- Mannchalay
- Noor Pur Ki Rani
- Chemistry (drama)
- Perfume Chowk
- Kash Mai Teri Beti Na Hoti
- Kash Main Teri Beti Na Hoti
- Meri Behan Maya
- Raju Rocket
- Rehaai
- Sannata

=== Filmography ===
- Jalaibee (2014)

=== Telefilms ===
Name	Airing Date	Cast	Director	Channel
Climax	5 December 2009	Samina Peerzada & Khalid Ahmen	S Mazhar Moin	Hum TV
Unkahi Unsuni	21 May 2010	Badar Khalil & Eshita Mehboob	S Mazhar Moin	Hum TV
Miss Garam Masala	12 September 2010	Sumbul Iqbal	Moomal Shunaid	Hum TV
Koi Janay Na	14 September 2010	Zeeba Bakhtiar & Khalid Anum	Najam Sethi	Hum TV
Nek Parveen	17 November 2010	Mehreen Raheel	—	Hum TV
Piano Girl	25 December 2010	Ayesha Omar	—	Hum TV
Pappu Ka Parosan	23 April 2011	Alishba Yousaf	Irfan Aslam & Akhtar Hasnain	Hum TV
Bolti Pyar	11 June 2011	Eshita Mehboob	Momina Duraid	Hum TV
Love Hit To Life Hit	1 September 2011	—	Ainy Jaffri	Hum TV
Haseena Maan Jayegi	7 November 2011	Sumbul Iqbal	—	Hum TV
Papa Razzi	21 August 2012	Mawra Hocane	—	Ary Digital
Jo Haara Woh Sikander	22 August 2012	Sajal Ali	—	Express Entertainment
Kya Pyar Ho Gaya	9 August 2013	Sajal Ali	—	Hum TV
Rahay Salamat Jodi	10 August 2013	Ushna Shah & Sara Khan	—	TV One
Shezy Aur Sheeloo	15 October 2013	Neelam Munir, Seemi Pasha & Behroz Sabzwari.	Misbah Khalid	Hum TV

=== Episodic dramas ===
- Kitni Girhain Baqi Hain – Poshak (2011)
- Kitni Girhain Baqi Hain – Tere Bina (2012)
- Kitni Girhain Baqi Hain – Be Rehamam (2013)
