= Bashar Lulua =

Bashar Lulua (Arabic: بشار لؤلؤة; 19 September 1963) is a Cambridge-based freelance orchestra conductor of Arab heritage. He is the founding conductor & manager of the 'Ur Performing Arts ensemble.

== Early life ==
Lulua was born in Damascus, Syria on 19 September 1963 to an Iraqi father and a Palestinian mother who had met in Cleveland, Ohio, while working on their graduate degrees in English literature.

He received his initial musical education at the Baghdad Conservatoire (or the Model School of Music & Ballet, 1970–71; 1972–81), where he was classically trained by Soviet, Hungarian, and Arab music teachers, and spent some of his formative years in Kuwait City (1967–70), and Cambridge, England (1971–72), where he began to learn English at the Church of England Grantchester Primary School. He pursued his musical studies in Vienna and Salzburg (1981–85), Kent, Ohio (1985–88), Austin, Texas (1988–93), as well as San Francisco, and Los Angeles, California (1994–96 and 1998–2000, respectively).

== Career ==
Having studied conducting privately with Peter Richter de Rangenier at the Vienna Music University, with Frank Wiley at Kent State University, Kent, Ohio, and with Louis Lane at The University of Texas at Austin, Lulua received further practical training from the San Francisco Symphony and the Los Angeles Philharmonic Orchestra, Herbert Blomstedt and Esa-Pekka Salonen, music directors, respectively.

Since 1978, Lulua has conducted performances in the Arab world, Europe, and the United States. He has also founded several orchestras, including The 'Ur Orchestra in Austin, Texas and Philharmonia Scotland in Glasgow.

Lulua was invited by the renowned London-based American composer Stephen Montague to contribute to the BBC Symphony Orchestra-sponsored "John Cage UnCaged Musicircus" at the Barbican Centre, London, in January 2004. Lulua's contribution was to guide a performance of Christian Wolff (composer)'s Burdocks (1970-71) with the Harrow Symphony Orchestra's New Music Ensemble.

While residing in Berlin from 2008 to 2009, Lulua co-translated, alongside the chairman of the German Department, Baghdad University, the best-selling historical German novel Die Karawanenkönigin by Tessa Korber into Arabic. This translation was published in Berlin in 2009.

In a 2009 masterclass presided over by Maestro Jorma Panula with the Rousse Philharmonic Orchestra in Bulgaria, Bashar conducted the first movement of the Resurrection Symphony by Gustav Mahler. Lulua returned to Bulgaria in 2013 to conduct Act 3 of Giacomo Puccini's La bohème at the Burgas State Opera.

Lulua is the Principal Guest Conductor of the Camerata Miskolc in Miskolc, Hungary, with whom he recorded rarely performed works, such as Antonín Dvořák's Notturno in B, op. 40, Carl Nielsen's Little Suite for strings, op. 1, and Jean Sibelius' Romance in C, op. 42, Impromptu, and Rakastava (The Lover), op. 14, in May 2011.

== Personal life ==
He is a naturalised citizen of the United Kingdom.
