= Toufic El Bacha =

Lebanese composer and musician

Toufic El Bacha (in Arabic توفيق الباشا) also written as Toufiq/Tawfiq el Basha/Al Basha (b. in Beirut, Lebanon 1924 - died Lebanon 2005) was a Lebanese composer and musician.

== Life ==
Toufic El Bacha composed songs for Lebanese and Arab singers, and he composed music for traditional Arabic literary works, films and various orchestras. His works were released in a compilation of 17 CDs in 1998. He published three books:

- Al Mukhtar min al Muwashahat al Andalusiyyah المختار من الموشحات الاندلسية
- Al Iiqaa' fil Musiiqa al Arabiyyah الايقاع في الموسيقى العربية
- Al Kamaan wal Arbaa' as Sawtiyyah الكمان والارباع الصوتية

El Bacha was decorated many times by Lebanese, Arab and international authorities.
